This is an incomplete list of Statutory Instruments of the United Kingdom in 2001. There is 2280 items listed here, out of a total of 2285

Statutory Instruments

1-100
The Road Traffic (Permitted Parking Area and Special Parking Area) (County of Kent) (District of Dover) Order 2001 SI 2001/1
The Pet Travel Scheme (Pilot Arrangements) (England) (Amendment) Order 2001 SI 2001/6
The Climate Change Levy (Registration and Miscellaneous Provisions) Regulations 2001 SI 2001/7
The Post Office Company (Nomination and Appointed Day) Order 2001 SI 2001/8
The Fishing Vessels (Code of Practice for the Safety of Small Fishing Vessels) Regulations 2001 SI 2001/9
The General Osteopathic Council (Election of Members and Chairman of Council) Rules Order of Council 2001 SI 2001/15
The Norfolk and Norwich Health Care National Health Service Trust Change of Name and (Establishment) Amendment Order 2001 SI 2001/16
The Federal Republic of Yugoslavia (Supply, Sale and Export of Petroleum and Petroleum Products) (Revocation) Regulations 2001 SI 2001/17
The Social Security (Claims and Payments) Amendment Regulations 2001 SI 2001/18
The Tax Credits Schemes (Miscellaneous Amendments) Regulations 2001 SI 2001/19
The Tax Credits Schemes (Miscellaneous Amendments) (Northern Ireland) Regulations 2001 SI 2001/20
Employment Rights (Increase of Limits) Order 2001 SI 2001/21
The Social Security Amendment (Capital Disregards) Regulations 2001 SI 2001/22
The General Teaching Council for England (Registration of Teachers) (Amendment) Regulations 2001 SI 2001/23
The Authorisation of Works (Listed Buildings) (England) Order 2001 SI 2001/24
The Motor Vehicles (Approval) Regulations 2001 SI 2001/25
The South Staffordshire Healthcare National Health Service Trust (Establishment) Order 2001 SI 2001/44
The Social Security (Contributions) (Amendment) Regulations 2001 SI 2001/45
The Social Security (Contributions) (Amendment) (Northern Ireland) Regulations 2001 SI 2001/46
The Greater London Magistrates' Courts Authority (Funding) Regulations 2001 SI 2001/47
The Council for Licensed Conveyancers (Disciplinary Powers) Order 2001 SI 2001/48
The Trustee Act 2000 (Commencement) Order 2001 SI 2001/49
The First Community Health, the Foundation and the Premier Health National Health Service Trusts (Dissolution) Order 2001 SI 2001/51
The Immigration Appeals (Family Visitor) (Amendment) Regulations 2001 SI 2001/52
The Motor Vehicles (Driving Licences) (Amendment) Regulations 2001 SI 2001/53
The Merchant Shipping and Fishing Vessels (Health and Safety at Work) (Amendment) Regulations 2001 SI 2001/54
The Units of Measurement Regulations 2001 SI 2001/55
The Income Tax (Electronic Communications) (Incentive Payments) Regulations 2001 SI 2001/56
The Transport Act 2000 (Commencement 3) Order 2001 SI 2001/57
The National Assistance (Assessment of Resources) (Amendment) (England) Regulations 2001 SI 2001/58
The Federal Republic of Yugoslavia (Freezing of Funds) Regulations 2001 SI 2001/59
The Miscellaneous Food Additives (Amendment) (England) Regulations 2001 SI 2001/60
The Whipps Cross Hospital National Health Service Trust (Establishment) Amendment Order 2001 SI 2001/65
The Wyre Forest Primary Care Trust (Establishment) Order 2001 SI 2001/66
The Burntwood, Lichfield and Tamworth Primary Care Trust (Establishment) Order 2001 SI 2001/67
The Local Elections (Parishes and Communities) (Amendment) Rules 2001 SI 2001/80
The Local Elections (Principal Areas) (Amendment) Rules 2001 SI 2001/81
The Registration of Political Parties (Prohibited Words and Expressions) Order 2001 SI 2001/82
The Registration of Political Parties (Fees) Order 2001 SI 2001/83
The Holders of Hereditary Peerages (Overseas Electors) (Transitional Provisions) Order 2001 SI 2001/84
The Weights and Measures (Metrication Amendments) Regulations 2001 SI 2001/85
The Companies (Unregistered Companies) (Amendment) Regulations 2001 SI 2001/86
The Graduated Vehicle Excise Duty (Prescribed Types of Fuel) Regulations 2001 SI 2001/93
The North East Lincolnshire and the Scunthorpe and Goole Hospitals National Health Service Trusts (Dissolution) Order 2001 SI 2001/96
The Central Sheffield University Hospitals and the Northern General Hospital National Health Service Trusts (Dissolution) Order 2001 SI 2001/97

101-200
The Education (Induction Arrangements for School Teachers) (Amendment) (England) Regulations 2001 SI 2001/103
The Stakeholder Pension Schemes (Amendment) Regulations 2001 SI 2001/104
The Charities (Most Honourable and Loyal Society of Ancient Britons (known as St. David's School)) Order 2001 SI 2001/106
The Proscribed Organisations (Applications for Deproscription) Regulations 2001 SI 2001/107
The Countryside and Rights of Way Act 2000 (Commencement 1) Order 2001 SI 2001/114
The Transport Act 2000 (Commencement 3) (Amendment) Order 2001 SI 2001/115
The Representation of the People Act 2000 (Commencement) Order 2001 SI 2001/116
The Personal Pension Schemes (Restriction on Discretion to Approve) (Permitted Investments) Regulations 2001 SI 2001/117
The Personal Pension Schemes (Conversion of Retirement Benefits Schemes) Regulations 2001 SI 2001/118
The Personal Pension Schemes (Transfer Payments) Regulations 2001 SI 2001/119
The Proscribed Organisations Appeal Commission (Human Rights Act Proceedings) Rules 2001 SI 2001/127
The Chesterfield Primary Care Trust (Establishment) Order 2001 SI 2001/128
The Gedling Primary Care Trust (Establishment) Order 2001 SI 2001/129
The Amber Valley Primary Care Trust (Establishment) Order 2001 SI 2001/130
The North Sheffield Primary Care Trust (Establishment) Order 2001 SI 2001/131
The North Lincolnshire Primary Care Trust (Establishment) Order 2001 SI 2001/132
The North Eastern Derbyshire Primary Care Trust (Establishment) Order 2001 SI 2001/133
The Melton, Rutland and Harborough Primary Care Trust (Establishment) Order 2001 SI 2001/134
The Access to Justice Act 1999 (Bar Practising Certificates) Order 2001 SI 2001/135
The Leicester City West Primary Care Trust (Establishment) Order 2001 SI 2001/136
The Doncaster East Primary Care Trust (Establishment) Order 2001 SI 2001/137
The Doncaster West Primary Care Trust (Establishment) Order 2001 SI 2001/138
The Care Standards Act 2000 (Commencement2 and Transitional Provisions) (Wales) Order 2001 SI 2001/139
The Children's Homes Amendment (Wales) Regulations 2001 SI 2001/140
The Merchant Shipping (Mandatory Surveys for Ro-Ro Ferry and High Speed Passenger Craft) Regulations 2001 SI 2001/152
The Child Support, Pensions and Social Security Act 2000 (Commencement 6) Order 2001 SI 2001/153
The United Lincolnshire Hospitals National Health Service Trust (Establishment) Amendment Order 2001 SI 2001/154
The Child Support (Maintenance Calculations and Special Cases) Regulations 2000 SI 2001/155
The Child Support (Variations) Regulations 2000 SI 2001/156
The Child Support (Maintenance Calculation Procedure) Regulations 2000 SI 2001/157
The Child Support (Consequential Amendments and Transitional Provisions) Regulations 2001 SI 2001/158
The Terrorism Act 2000 (Code of Practice on Audio Recording of Interviews) Order 2001 SI 2001/159
The Guaranteed Minimum Pensions Increase (No.2) Order 2000 SI 2001/160
The Child Support (Information, Evidence and Disclosure and Maintenance Arrangements and Jurisdiction) (Amendment) Regulations 2000 SI 2001/161
The Child Support (Collection and Enforcement and Miscellaneous Amendments) Regulations 2000 SI 2001/162
The South Stoke Primary Care Trust (Establishment) Order 2001 SI 2001/163
The Magistrates' Courts (Civilian Enforcement Officers) Rules 2001 SI 2001/164
The Magistrates' Courts (Children and Young Persons) (Amendment) Rules 2001 SI 2001/165
The Magistrates' Courts (Forms) (Amendment) Rules 2001 SI 2001/166
The Magistrates' Courts (Amendment) Rules 2001 SI 2001/167
The Access to Justice Act 1999 (Commencement 6 and Transitional Provisions) Order 2001 SI 2001/168
The Trustees for the Central Sheffield University Hospitals National Health Service Trust (Transfer of Trust Property) Order 2001 SI 2001/169
The Special Trustees for King's College Hospital (Transfer of Trust Property) Order 2001 SI 2001/170
The Special Trustees for St George's Hospital (Transfer of Trust Property) Order 2001 SI 2001/171
The Trustees for the Northern General Hospital National Health Service Trust (Transfer of Trust Property) Order 2001 SI 2001/172
The Special Trustees for Newcastle University Hospitals (Transfer of Trust Property) Order 2001 SI 2001/173
The Greater Derby Primary Care Trust (Establishment) Order 2001 SI 2001/174
The Eastern Leicester Primary Care Trust (Establishment) Order 2001 SI 2001/175
The Ashfield Primary Care Trust (Establishment) Order 2001 SI 2001/176
The Rushcliffe Primary Care Trust (Establishment) Order 2001 SI 2001/177
The Channel Tunnel (International Arrangements) (Amendment) Order 2001 SI 2001/178
The Legal Advice and Assistance (Scope) (Amendment) Regulations 2001 SI 2001/179
The Road Traffic (Permitted Parking Area and Special Parking Area) (County of Somerset) (District of Taunton Deane) Order 2001 SI 2001/180
The Nottingham City Primary Care Trust (Establishment) Order 2001 SI 2001/181
The Sheffield West Primary Care Trust (Establishment) Order 2001 SI 2001/182
The Sheffield South West Primary Care Trust (Establishment) Order 2001 SI 2001/183
The South East Sheffield Primary Care Trust (Establishment) Order 2001 SI 2001/184
The Erewash Primary Care Trust (Establishment) Order 2001 SI 2001/185
The Bassetlaw Primary Care Trust (Establishment) Order 2001 SI 2001/186
The Broxtowe & Hucknall Primary Care Trust (Establishment) Order 2001 SI 2001/187
The Human Fertilisation and Embryology (Research Purposes) Regulations 2001 SI 2001/188
The Terrorism Act 2000 (Code of Practice on Audio Recording of Interviews) (No. 2) Order 2001 SI 2001/189
The St George's Healthcare National Health Service Trust (Transfer of Trust Property) Order 2001 SI 2001/190
The Legal Advice and Assistance (Amendment) Regulations 2001 SI 2001/191
The Terrorism Act 2000 (Crown Servants and Regulators) Regulations 2001 SI 2001/192
The Crown Court (Amendment) Rules 2001 SI 2001/193
The Magistrates' Courts (Detention and Forfeiture of Terrorist Cash) Rules 2001 SI 2001/194
The European Communities (Recognition of Professional Qualifications) (Second General System) (Amendment) Regulations 2001 SI 2001/200

201-300
The Countryside and Rights of Way Act 2000 (Commencement 1) (Wales) Order 2001 SI 2001/203
The Taxes (Interest Rate) (Amendment 1) Regulations 2001 SI 2001/204
The Housing (Right to Buy) (Priority of Charges) (England) Order 2001 SI 2001/205
The Statutory Maternity Pay (General) and Statutory Sick Pay (General) (Amendment) Regulations 2001 SI 2001/206
The Social Security Benefits Up-rating (No. 2) Order 2000 SI 2001/207
The Additional Pension (First Appointed Year) Order 2001 SI 2001/208
The Education (Designated Institutions) Order 2001 SI 2001/209
The Education Standards Fund 2000 (England) (Amendment) Regulations 2001 SI 2001/210
The Solihull Primary Care Trust (Establishment) Order 2001 SI 2001/211
The Solihull Healthcare National Health Service Trust (Dissolution) Order 2001 SI 2001/212
The Newcastle, North Tyneside and Northumberland Mental Health National Health Service Trust (Establishment) Order 2001 SI 2001/213
The Newcastle City Health and the Northumberland Mental Health National Health Service Trusts (Dissolution) Order 2001 SI 2001/214
The Local Authorities (Alteration of Requisite Calculations) (England) Regulations 2001 SI 2001/216
The British Railways Board (Reduction of Membership) Order 2001 SI 2001/217
The Strategic Rail Authority (Licence Exemption) Order 2001 SI 2001/218
The Major Precepting Authorities (Excessive Budget Requirements—Payments) (England) Regulations 2001 SI 2001/219
The Lincoln District Healthcare and the South Lincolnshire Healthcare National Health Service Trusts (Dissolution) Order 2001 SI 2001/220
The Lincolnshire Healthcare National Health Service Trust (Establishment) Order 2001 SI 2001/221
The Political Parties, Elections and Referendums Act 2000 (Commencement 1 and Transitional Provisions) Order 2001 SI 2001/222
The Broadcasting (Limit on the Holding of Licences to Provide Television Multiplex Services) Order 2001 SI 2001/223
The Greater Manchester (Light Rapid Transit System) (Ashton Moss Variation) Order 2001 SI 2001/224
The Motor Vehicles (Driving Licences) (Amendment) (No. 2) Regulations 2001 SI 2001/236
The Employment Tribunals (Increase of Maximum Deposit) Order 2001 SI 2001/237
The Detention Centre Rules 2001 SI 2001/238
The Immigration and Asylum Act 1999 (Commencement 9) Order 2001 SI 2001/239
The Detention Centre (Specified Diseases) Order 2001 SI 2001/240
The Immigration (Suspension of Detainee Custody Officer Certificate) Regulations 2001 SI 2001/241
The Transport Act 2000 (Commencement 4)Order 2001 SI 2001/242
The Local Authorities (Goods and Services) (Public Bodies) (England) Order 2001 SI 2001/243
The Bromley Primary Care Trust (Establishment) Order 2001 SI 2001/248
The Tower Hamlets Primary Care Trust (Establishment) Order 2001 SI 2001/249
The Rail Vehicle Accessibility (Connex South Eastern Class 375 Vehicles) Exemption (Amendment) Order 2001 SI 2001/250
The Pig Industry Restructuring (Capital Grant) Scheme 2001 SI 2001/251
The Pig Industry Restructuring (Non-Capital Grant) Scheme 2001 SI 2001/252
The Finance Act 1989, Section 178(1), (Appointed Day) Order 2001 SI 2001/253
The Taxes (Interest Rate) (Amendment 2) Regulations 2001 SI 2001/254
The Stamp Duty Reserve Tax (Investment Exchanges and Clearing Houses) (The London Stock Exchange) Regulations 2001 SI 2001/255
The Civil Procedure (Amendment) Rules 2001 SI 2001/256
The Pensions Appeal Tribunals (England and Wales) (Amendment) Rules 2001 SI 2001/257
The Company and Business Names (Chamber of Commerce, Etc.) Act 1999 (Commencement) Order 2001 SI 2001/258
The Company and Business Names (Amendment) Regulations 2001 SI 2001/259
The Charities (Exception from Registration) (Amendment) Regulations 2001 SI 2001/260
The Employment Zones (Amendment) Regulations 2001 SI 2001/261
The Strategic Rail Authority (Capital Allowances) Order 2001 SI 2001/262
The Vale of Aylesbury Primary Care Trust (Establishment) Order 2001 SI 2001/268
The Hertfordshire Partnership National Health Service Trust (Establishment) Order 2001 SI 2001/269
The Health Act 1999 (Commencement 10) Order 2001 SI 2001/270
The Avon and Western Wiltshire Mental Health Care National Health Service Trust (Change of Name) Order 2001 SI 2001/271
The City and Hackney Primary Care Trust (Establishment) Order 2001 SI 2001/272
The Lincolnshire South West Primary Care Trust (Establishment) Order 2001 SI 2001/273
The West Lincolnshire Primary Care Trust (Establishment) Order 2001 SI 2001/274
The School Milk (Wales) Regulations 2001 SI 2001/275
The National Assistance (Assessment of Resources) (Amendment) (Wales) Regulations 2001 SI 2001/276
The Rail Vehicle Accessibility (ScotRail Class 334 Vehicles) Exemption Order 2001 SI 2001/277
The Teddington, Twickenham and Hamptons Primary Care Trust (Establishment) Order 2001 SI 2001/278
The Kingston Primary Care Trust (Establishment) Order 2001 SI 2001/279
The Carriers' Liability (Clandestine Entrants) (Application to Rail Freight) Regulations 2001 SI 2001/280
The Sheep Annual Premium (Amendment) Regulations 2001 SI 2001/281
The Hastings and St Leonards Primary Care Trust (Establishment) Order 2001 SI 2001/282
The Bexhill and Rother Primary Care Trust (Establishment) Order 2001 SI 2001/283
The South West Kent Primary Care Trust (Establishment) Order 2001 SI 2001/284
The Maidstone and Malling Primary Care Trust (Establishment) Order 2001 SI 2001/285
The Northamptonshire Healthcare National Health Service Trust (Establishment) Order 2001 SI 2001/286
The Air Traffic Services (Exemption) Order 2001 SI 2001/287
The Special Trustees for the Former United Birmingham Hospitals (Transfer of Trust Property) Order 2001 SI 2001/288
The National Health Service (General Dental Services) Amendment Regulations 2001 SI 2001/289
The Care Standards Act 2000 (Commencement 2 (England) and Transitional Provisions) Order 2001 SI 2001/290

301-400
The Road Vehicles (Construction and Use) (Amendment) Regulations 2001 SI 2001/306
The Goods Vehicles (Plating and Testing) (Amendment) Regulations 2001 SI 2001/307
The Education (London Residuary Body) (Property Transfer) (Revocation) Order 2001 SI 2001/308
The Goods Vehicles (Authorisation of International Journeys) (Fees) (Amendment) Regulations 2001 SI 2001/309
The European Communities (Matrimonial Jurisdiction and Judgments) Regulations 2001 SI 2001/310
The Carriers' Liability (Clandestine Entrants and Sale of Transporters) (Amendment) Regulations 2001 SI 2001/311
The Carriers' Liability (Clandestine Entrants) (Codeof Practice for Rail Freight) Order 2001 SI 2001/312
The Social Security (Contributions) (Amendment 2) Regulations 2001 SI 2001/313
The Social Security (Contributions) (Amendment 2) (Northern Ireland) Regulations 2001 SI 2001/314
The Merger Report (Interbrew SA and Bass PLC) (Interim Provision) Order 2001 SI 2001/318
The Competition Act 1998 (Public Transport Ticketing Schemes Block Exemption) Order 2001 SI 2001/319
The Greater London Authority (Allocation of Grants for Precept Calculations) Regulations 2001 SI 2001/320
The Transport Act 2000 (Designation of Companies) Order 2001 SI 2001/321
The South West Dorset Primary Care Trust (Establishment) Order 2001 SI 2001/322
The Berkshire Healthcare National Health Service Trust (Establishment) Order 2001 SI 2001/323
The North Essex Mental Health Partnership National Health Service Trust (Establishment) Order 2001 SI 2001/324
The Exeter Primary Care Trust Establishment) Order 2001 SI 2001/325
The East Berkshire National Health Service Trust for People with Learning Disabilities and the West Berkshire Priority Care Service National Health Service Trust (Dissolution) Order 2001 SI 2001/326
The University Hospital Birmingham National Health Service Trust (Transfer of Trust Property) Order 2001 SI 2001/327
The Barnet Primary Care Trust (Establishment) Order 2001 SI 2001/328
The Haringey Primary Care Trust (Establishment) Order 2001 SI 2001/329
The East Hampshire Primary Care Trust (Establishment) Order 2001 SI 2001/331
The Mid-Sussex Primary Care Trust (Establishment) Order 2001 SI 2001/332
The Buckinghamshire Mental Health National Health Service Trust (Establishment) Order 2001 SI 2001/333
The Aylesbury Vale Community Healthcare National Health Service Trust (Dissolution) Order 2001 SI 2001/334
The South Wiltshire Primary Care Trust (Establishment) Order 2001 SI 2001/335
The Birmingham Children's Hospital National Health Service Trust (Transfer of Trust Property) Order 2001 SI 2001/336
The Education (The Arts Institute at Bournemouth Further Education Corporation) (Transfer to the Higher Education Sector) Order 2001 SI 2001/337
The Criminal Justice and Court Services Act 2000 (Commencement 2 ) Order 2001 SI 2001/340
The Representation of the People (England and Wales) Regulations 2001 SI 2001/341
The Feeding Stuffs (Wales) Regulations 2001 SI 2001/343
The Chingford, Wanstead and Woodford Primary Care Trust (Establishment) Order 2001 SI 2001/344
The North Cheshire Hospitals National Health Service Trust (Establishment) Order 2001 SI 2001/345
The Slough Primary Care Trust (Establishment) Order 2001 SI 2001/346
The Wokingham Primary Care Trust (Establishment) Order 2001 SI 2001/347
The Barking and Dagenham Primary Care Trust (Establishment) Order 2001 SI 2001/348
The Walthamstow, Leyton and Leytonstone Primary Care Trust (Establishment) Order 2001 SI 2001/349
The Newham Primary Care Trust (Establishment) Order 2001 SI 2001/350
The Reading Primary Care Trust (Establishment) Order 2001 SI 2001/351
The Redbridge Primary Care Trust (Establishment) Order 2001 SI 2001/352
The Civil Aviation (Publication of Directions) Regulations 2001 SI 2001/353
The Aerodromes (Designation) (Chargeable Air Services) Order 2001 SI 2001/354
The Pension Sharing (Excepted Schemes) Order 2001 SI 2001/358
The Commission for the New Towns (Transfer of Undertaking and Functions) (Tees Barrage) Order 2001 SI 2001/361
The Community Charges, Council Tax and Non-Domestic Rating (Enforcement) (Magistrates' Courts) (England) Regulations 2001 SI 2001/362
The Watford and Three Rivers Primary Care Trust (Establishment) Order 2001 SI 2001/364
The Welwyn Hatfield Primary Care Trust (Establishment) Order 2001 SI 2001/365
The Tax Credits Schemes (Miscellaneous Amendments 2) (Northern Ireland) Regulations 2001 SI 2001/366
The Tax Credits Schemes (Miscellaneous Amendments 2) Regulations 2001 SI 2001/367
The Motor Cycles Etc. (EC Type Approval) (Amendment) Regulations 2001 SI 2001/368
The Luton Primary Care Trust (Establishment) Order 2001 SI 2001/369
The Uttlesford Primary Care Trust (Establishment) Order 2001 SI 2001/370
The South East Hertfordshire Primary Care Trust (Establishment) Order 2001 SI 2001/371
The Artificial Insemination of Cattle (Animal Health) (Amendment) (England) Regulations 2001 SI 2001/380
The Bedford Primary Care Trust (Establishment) Order 2001 SI 2001/381
The Dacorum Primary Care Trust (Establishment) Order 2001 SI 2001/382
The Great Yarmouth Primary Care Trust (Establishment) Order 2001 SI 2001/383
The Local Authorities (Capital Finance) (Rate of Discount for 2001/02) (England) Regulations 2001 SI 2001/384
The Norwich Primary Care Trust (Establishment) Order 2001 SI 2001/385
The St. Albans and Harpenden Primary Care Trust (Establishment) Order 2001 SI 2001/386
The Thurrock Primary Care Trust (Establishment) Order 2001 SI 2001/387
The Basildon Primary Care Trust (Establishment) Order 2001 SI 2001/388
The Bedfordshire Heartlands Primary Care Trust (Establishment) Order 2001 SI 2001/389
The Royston, Buntingford and Bishop's Stortford Primary Care Trust (Establishment) Order 2001 SI 2001/390
The Investment Trusts (Approval of Accounting Methods for Creditor Relationships) Order 2001 SI 2001/391
The Afghanistan (United Nations Sanctions) (Overseas Territories) Order 2001 SI 2001/392
The Afghanistan (United Nations Sanctions) Channel Islands) Order 2001 SI 2001/393
The Afghanistan (United Nations Sanctions) (Isle of Man) Order 2001 SI 2001/394
The Iraq (United Nations Sanctions) (Overseas Territories) (Amendment) Order 2001 SI 2001/395
The Afghanistan (United Nations Sanctions) Order 2001 SI 2001/396
The Air Navigation (Amendment) Order 2001 SI 2001/397
The National Assembly for Wales (Transfer of Land) Order 2001 SI 2001/398
The Civil Aviation (Chargeable Air Services) (Records) Regulations 2001 SI 2001/399
The Representation of the People (Northern Ireland) Regulations 2001 SI 2001/400

401-500
The Terrorism Act 2000 (Code of Practice on the Exercise of Police Powers) (Northern Ireland) Order 2001 SI 2001/401
The Terrorism Act 2000 (Code of Practice on Video Recording of Interviews) (Northern Ireland) Order 2001 SI 2001/402
The Income Tax (Manufactured Overseas Dividends) (Amendment) Regulations 2001 SI 2001/403
The Income Tax (Building Societies) (Dividends and Interest) (Amendment) Regulations 2001 SI 2001/404
The Income Tax (Interest Payments) (Information Powers) (Amendment) Regulations 2001 SI 2001/405
The Income Tax (Deposit-takers) (Interest Payments) (Amendment) Regulations 2001 SI 2001/406
The Social Security (Reciprocal Agreements) Order 2001 SI 2001/407
The Pensions Appeal Tribunals (Posthumous Appeals) Amendment Order 2001 SI 2001/408
The Naval, Military and Air Forces Etc. (Disablement and Death) Service Pensions Amendment Order 2001 SI 2001/409
The Reciprocal Enforcement of Maintenance Orders (Variation) Order 2001 SI 2001/410
The European Convention on Cinematographic Co-production (Amendment) Order 2001 SI 2001/411
The United Nations (International Tribunals) (Former Yugoslavia and Rwanda) (Amendment) Order 2001 SI 2001/412
The European Communities (Definition of Treaties) (The Convention on Mutual Assistance and Co-operation between Customs Administrations (Naples II)) Order 2001 SI 2001/413
National Health Service (Optical Charges and Payments) and (General Ophthalmic Services) Amendment Regulations 2001 SI 2001/414
The Local Government Act 2000 (Commencement 6) Order 2001 SI 2001/415
The Port of Tyne Harbour Revision Order 2001 SI 2001/416
The Local Elections (Northern Ireland) (Amendment) Order 2001 SI 2001/417
The Channel Tunnel (International Arrangements) (Amendment 2) Order 2001 SI 2001/418
The War Pensions (Mercantile Marine) (Amendment) Scheme 2001 SI 2001/419
The Personal Injuries (Civilians) Amendment Scheme 2001 SI 2001/420
The Terrorism Act 2000 (Commencement 3) Order 2001 SI 2001/421
The Smoke Control Areas (Exempted Fireplaces) (England) Order 2001 SI 2001/422
The Tir Gofal (Amendment) (Wales) Regulations 2001 SI 2001/423
The Organic Farming Scheme (Wales) Regulations 2001 SI 2001/424
The Terrorism Act 2000 (Code of Practice for Authorised Officers) Order 2001 SI 2001/425
The Terrorism Act 2000 (Carding) Order 2001 SI 2001/426
The Terrorism Act 2000 (Code of Practice for Examining Officers) Order 2001 SI 2001/427
The Terrorism (Interviews) (Scotland) Order 2001 SI 2001/428
The National Park Authorities Levies (Wales) (Amendment) Regulations 2001 SI 2001/429
The Organic Products Regulations 2001 SI 2001/430
The England Rural Development Programme (Enforcement) (Amendment) Regulations 2001 SI 2001/431
The Organic Farming (England Rural Development Programme) Regulations 2001 SI 2001/432
The A614 Nottingham to Bawtry Trunk Road (Longdale Lane Junction Improvement) Order 2001 SI 2001/433
The M5 Motorway (Junction 12 Improvement Slip Roads) Order 2001 SI 2001/434
The Local Education Authority—School Relations Code of Practice Order 2001 SI 2001/435
The Stockport Primary Care Trust (Establishment) Order 2001 SI 2001/436
The Bootle and Litherland Primary Care Trust (Establishment) Order 2001 SI 2001/437
The Heywood and Middleton Primary Care Trust (Establishment) Order 2001 SI 2001/438
The Bebington and West Wirral Primary Care Trust (Establishment) Order 2001 SI 2001/439
The Trafford North Primary Care Trust (Establishment) Order 2001 SI 2001/440
The Carers (Services) and Direct Payments (Amendment) (England) Regulations 2001 SI 2001/441
The Disabled Children (Direct Payments) (England) Regulations 2001 SI 2001/442
The Proscribed Organisations Appeal Commission (Procedure) Rules 2001 SI 2001/443
The Criminal Justice Acts 1987 and 1991 (Notice of Transfer) (Amendment) Regulations 2001 SI 2001/444
The Companies (EU Political Expenditure) Exemption Order 2001 SI 2001/445
The Political Parties, Elections and Referendums Act 2000 (Disapplication of Part IV for Northern Ireland Parties, etc.) Order 2001 SI 2001/446
The Restriction on Pithing (England) Regulations 2001 SI 2001/447
The Isles of Scilly (Health) Order 2001 SI 2001/448
The A10 London–Cambridge–King's Lynn Trunk Road (A47 King's Lynn to A14 Milton, Cambridgeshire) Detrunking Order 2001 SI 2001/449
The A134 Thetford to Tottenhill Trunk Road (A11 Thetford Bypass to A10 Tottenhill) Detrunking Order 2001 SI 2001/450
The A10 London–Cambridge–King's Lynn Trunk Road (M11 Junction 11 to A505 Royston Hertfordshire) Detrunking Order 2001 SI 2001/451
The Justices' Chief Executives (Accounts) Regulations 2001 SI 2001/463
The Plymouth Primary Care Trust (Establishment) Order 2001 SI 2001/465
The Mid Devon Primary Care Trust (Establishment) Order 2001 SI 2001/466
The Teignbridge Primary Care Trust (Establishment) Order 2001 SI 2001/467
The East Devon Primary Care Trust (Establishment) Order 2001 SI 2001/468
The Mendip Primary Care Trust (Establishment) Order 2001 SI 2001/469
The West Wiltshire Primary Care Trust (Establishment) Order 2001 SI 2001/470
The Somerset Coast Primary Care Trust (Establishment) Order 2001 SI 2001/471
The North Devon Primary Care Trust (Establishment) Order 2001 SI 2001/472
The Bath and North East Somerset Primary Care Trust (Establishment) Order 2001 SI 2001/473
The South and East Dorset Primary Care Trust (Establishment) Order 2001 SI 2001/474
The Financing of Maintained Schools (England) Regulations 2001 SI 2001/475
The Hill Farm Allowance Regulations 2001 SI 2001/476
The Social Security (Contributions) (Re-rating and National Insurance Funds Payments) Order 2001 SI 2001/477
The Parent Governor Representatives (England) Regulations 2001 SI 2001/478
The Climate Change Levy (Combined Heat and Power Stations) Exemption Certificate Regulations 2001 SI 2001/486
The Housing Benefit (General) Amendment Regulations 2001 SI 2001/487
The Social Security (Miscellaneous Amendments) Regulations 2001 SI 2001/488
The North East Oxfordshire Primary Care Trust (Establishment) Order 2001 SI 2001/489
The Oxford City Primary Care Trust (Establishment) Order 2001 SI 2001/490
The Cherwell Vale Primary Care Trust (Establishment) Order 2001 SI 2001/491
The Transport Act 2000 (Amendment) Order 2001 SI 2001/492
The Civil Aviation (Chargeable Air Services) (Detention and Sale of Aircraft) Regulations 2001 SI 2001/493
The Civil Aviation (Chargeable Air Services) (Detention and Sale of Aircraft for Eurocontrol) Regulations 2001 SI 2001/494
The Financing of Maintained Schools (Amendment) (Wales) Regulations 2001 SI 2001/495
The Tir Mynydd (Wales) Regulations 2001 SI 2001/496
Representation of the People (Scotland) Regulations 2001 SI 2001/497
The Export Restrictions (Foot-And-Mouth Disease) Regulations 2001 SI 2001/498
The Rail Vehicle Accessibility (Midland Mainline Class 170/1 Vehicles) Exemption Order 2001 SI 2001/499
The North Tees Primary Care Trust (Establishment) Order 2001 SI 2001/500

501-600
The Yorkshire Wolds and Coast Primary Care Trust (Establishment) Order 2001 SI 2001/501
The Eastern Hull Primary Care Trust (Establishment) Order 2001 SI 2001/502
The Pollution Prevention and Control (England and Wales) (Amendment) Regulations 2001 SI 2001/503
The Wakefield West Primary Care Trust (Establishment) Order 2001 SI 2001/504
The North Tyneside Primary Care Trust (Establishment) Order 2001 SI 2001/505
The Eastern Wakefield Primary Care Trust (Establishment) Order 2001 SI 2001/506
The Carlisle and District Primary Care Trust (Establishment) Order 2001 SI 2001/507
The Selby and York Primary Care Trust (Establishment) Order 2001 SI 2001/508
The West Hull Primary Care Trust (Establishment) Order 2001 SI 2001/509
The Carers and Disabled Children Act 2000 (Commencement 1) (England) Order 2001 SI 2001/510
The East Yorkshire Primary Care Trust (Establishment) Order 2001 SI 2001/511
The West Cumbria Primary Care Trust (Establishment) Order 2001 SI 2001/512
The Newcastle Primary Care Trust (Establishment) Order 2001 SI 2001/513
The Eden Valley Primary Care Trust (Establishment) Order 2001 SI 2001/514
The Hartlepool Primary Care Trust (Establishment) Order 2001 SI 2001/515
The Financial Services and Markets Act 2000 (Commencement 1) Order 2001 SI 2001/516
The Social Security Amendment (Joint Claims) Regulations 2001 SI 2001/518
The Salford Primary Care Trust (Establishment) Order 2001 SI 2001/519
The Southport and Formby Primary Care Trust (Establishment) Order 2001 SI 2001/520
The Chorley and South Ribble Primary Care Trust (Establishment) Order 2001 SI 2001/521
The West Lancashire Primary Care Trust (Establishment) Order 2001 SI 2001/522
The South East Oxfordshire Primary Care Trust (Establishment) Order 2001 SI 2001/523
The Newbury and Community Primary Care Trust (Establishment) Order 2001 SI 2001/524
The South West Oxfordshire Primary Care Trust (Establishment) Order 2001 SI 2001/525
The Enfield Primary Care Trust (Establishment) Order 2001 SI 2001/526
The Havering Primary Care Trust (Establishment) Order 2001 SI 2001/527
The Greenwich Primary Care Trust (Establishment) Order 2001 SI 2001/528
The Postal Services Act 2000 (Commencement 2) Order 2001 SI 2001/534
The Representation of the People (Variation of Limits of Candidates' Election Expenses) Order 2001 SI 2001/535
The Nurses, Midwives and Health Visitors (Professional Conduct) (Amendment) Rules 2001 Approval Order 2001 SI 2001/536
The Housing Benefit and Council Tax Benefit (Extended Payments) Regulations 2001 SI 2001/537
The Social Security (Invalid Care Allowance) Amendment Regulations 2001 SI 2001/538
The Colchester Primary Care Trust (Establishment) Order 2001 SI 2001/539
The Isles of Scilly (Primary Care) Order 2001 SI 2001/540
The Feeding Stuffs (Sampling and Analysis) (Amendment) (England) Regulations 2001 SI 2001/541
The Royal Air Force Terms of Service (Amendment) Regulations 2001 SI 2001/542
The Huntingdonshire Primary Care Trust (Establishment) Order 2001 SI 2001/543
The Financial Services and Markets Act 2000 (Regulated Activities) Order 2001 SI 2001/544
Local Authorities (Alteration of Requisite Calculations) (Wales) Regulations 2001 SI 2001/559
The Road Vehicles Lighting (Amendment) Regulations 2001 SI 2001/560
The Road Vehicles (Display of Registration Marks) Regulations 2001 SI 2001/561
The Criminal Justice and Court Services Act 2000 (Commencement 3) Order 2001 SI 2001/562
The Education (Student Support) (European Institutions) (Amendment) Regulations 2001 SI 2001/563
The Race Relations (Amendment) Act 2000 (Commencement) Order 2001 SI 2001/566
The Tax Credits (Claims and Payments) (Amendment) Regulations 2001 SI 2001/567
The Tax Credits (Claims and Payments) (Northern Ireland) (Amendment) Regulations 2001 SI 2001/568
The Education (Budget Statements) (England) Regulations 2001 SI 2001/569
The Education (Outturn Statements) (England) Regulations 2001 SI 2001/570
The Foot-and-Mouth Disease (Amendment) (England) Order 2001 SI 2001/571
The Foot-and-Mouth Disease (Amendment) (Wales) Order 2001 SI 2001/572
The Social Security (Credits and Incapacity Benefit) Amendment Regulations 2001 SI 2001/573
The Mid-Hampshire Primary Care Trust (Establishment) Order 2001 SI 2001/574
The North Hertfordshire and Stevenage Primary Care Trust (Establishment) Order 2001 SI 2001/575
The Leicestershire (Recovery of Expenses) Order 2001 SI 2001/595
The Social Security (Contributions) (Amendment 3) Regulations 2001 SI 2001/596
The Social Security (Contributions) (Amendment 3) (Northern Ireland) Regulations 2001 SI 2001/597
The Financial Services Act 1986 (Electricity Industry Exemption) Order 2001 SI 2001/598
The Measuring Equipment (Capacity Measures) (Amendment) Regulations 2001 SI 2001/599
The Special Educational Needs Tribunal Regulations 2001 SI 2001/600

601-700
The New Forest Primary Care Trust (Establishment) Order 2001 SI 2001/601
The Greater London Magistrates' Courts Authority (Provision of Court-houses etc.) Regulation 2001 SI 2001/603
The Highways Noise Payments (Movable Homes) (Wales) Regulations 2001 SI 2001/604
The Local Government and Housing Act 1989 (Electronic Communications) (Wales) Order 2001 SI 2001/605
The Local Education Authority (Behaviour Support Plans) (Amendment) (Wales) Regulations 2001 SI 2001/606
The Homeless Persons (Priority Need) (Wales) Order 2001 SI 2001/607
The Diseases of Animals (Approved Disinfectants) (Amendment) (England) Order 2001 SI 2001/608
The Petty Sessions Areas (Divisions and Names) (Amendment) Regulations 2001 SI 2001/609
The Magistrates' Courts (Amendment 2) Rules 2001 SI 2001/610
The Costs in Criminal Cases (General) (Amendment) Regulations 2001 SI 2001/611
The Local Government (Magistrates' Courts etc.) (Amendment) Order 2001 SI 2001/612
The Criminal Appeal (Amendment) Rules 2001 SI 2001/613
The Crown Court (Amendment) Rules 2001 SI 2001/614
The Magistrates' Courts (Transfer of Justices' Clerks' Functions) (Miscellaneous Amendments) Rules 2001 SI 2001/615
The Legal Aid in Criminal and Care Proceedings (General) (Amendment) Regulations 2001 SI 2001/616
The Civil Legal Aid (General) (Amendment) Regulations 2001 SI 2001/617
Access to Justice Act 1999 (Transfer of Justices' Clerks' Functions) Order 2001 SI 2001/618
The Land Registration Rules 2001 SI 2001/619
The Postal Services Commission (Register) Order 2001 SI 2001/620
The Export Restrictions (Foot-And-Mouth Disease) (Amendment) Regulations 2001 SI 2001/627
The Community Drivers' Hours (Foot-and-Mouth Disease) (Temporary Exception) Regulations 2001 SI 2001/628
The Drivers' Hours (Goods Vehicles) (Milk Collection) (Temporary Exemption) Regulations 2001 SI 2001/629
The Value Added Tax (Amendment) Regulations 2001 SI 2001/630
The Social Security Revaluation of Earnings Factors Order 2001 SI 2001/631
The Income Tax (Cash Equivalents of Car Fuel Benefits) Order 2001 SI 2001/635
The Capital Gains Tax (Annual Exempt Amount) Order 2001 SI 2001/636
The Retirement Benefits Schemes (Indexation of Earnings Cap) Order 2001 SI 2001/637
The Income Tax (Indexation) Order 2001 SI 2001/638
The Inheritance Tax (Indexation) Order 2001 SI 2001/639
The Value Added Tax (Increase of Registration Limits) Order 2001 SI 2001/640
The Diseases of Animals (Approved Disinfectants) (Amendment) (Wales) Order 2001 SI 2001/641
The Pig Industry Restructuring Grant (Wales) Scheme 2001 SI 2001/643
The European Communities (Lawyer's Practice) (Amendment) Regulations 2001 SI 2001/644
The Solicitors' Incorporated Practices (Amendment) Order 2001 SI 2001/645
The Amalgamation of the Denge and Southbrooks, Pett, Romney Marsh Levels, Rother and Walland Marsh Internal Drainage Districts Order 2000 SI 2001/646
The Amalgamation of the South Gloucestershire and West Gloucestershire Internal Drainage Districts Order 2000 SI 2001/647
The Postal Services Act 2000 (Consequential Modifications to Local Enactments 1) Order 2001 SI 2001/648
The Sea Fish (Specified Sea Areas) (Regulation of Nets and Other Fishing Gear) Order 2001 SI 2001/649
The Prohibition of Fishing with Multiple Trawls Order 2001 SI 2001/650
The Disabled Facilities Grants and Home Repair Assistance (Maximum Amounts) (Amendment) (England) Order 2001 SI 2001/651
The Social Security (Miscellaneous Amendments) (No. 2) Regulations 2001 SI 2001/652
The Learning and Skills Act 2000 (Commencement 3 and Savings and Transitional Provisions) Order 2001 SI 2001/654
The Carlisle Hospitals, the North Lakeland Healthcare and the West Cumbria Health Care National Health Service Trusts (Dissolution) Order 2001 SI 2001/655
The North Cumbria Acute Hospitals National Health Service Trust (Establishment) Order 2001 SI 2001/656
The South Gloucestershire Primary Care Trust (Establishment) Order 2001 SI 2001/657
The Foot-and-Mouth Disease (Amendment) (Wales) (No. 2) Order 2001 SI 2001/658
The Import and Export Restrictions (Foot-And-Mouth Disease) (Wales) Regulations 2001 SI 2001/659
The European Communities (Matrimonial Jurisdiction and Judgments) (Northern Ireland) Regulations 2001 SI 2001/660
The Environmental Protection (Waste Recycling Payments) (Amendment) (England) Regulations 2001 SI 2001/661
The Climate Change Agreements (Eligible Facilities) Regulations 2001 SI 2001/662
The Contaminated Land (England) (Amendment) Regulations 2001 SI 2001/663
The Pensions Increase (Review) Order 2001 SI 2001/664
The Import and Export Restrictions (Foot-And-Mouth Disease) Regulations 2001 SI 2001/665
The Norfolk (Coroners' Districts) Order 2001 SI 2001/666
The Value Added Tax (Amendment) (No. 2) Regulations 2001 SI 2001/677
The Foot-and-Mouth Disease (Amendment) (England) (No. 2) Order 2001 SI 2001/680
The Common Agricultural Policy (Wine) (England and Northern Ireland) Regulations 2001 SI 2001/686
The Transport for London (Bus Lanes) Order 2001 SI 2001/690
The Local Authorities (Goods and Services) (Public Bodies) (England) (No. 2) Order 2001 SI 2001/691
The Education (Schools and Further and Higher Education) (Amendment) (England) Regulations 2001 SI 2001/692
The Petty Sessions Areas (Amendment) Order 2001 SI 2001/694
The Magistrates' Courts Committee Areas (Amendment) Order 2001 SI 2001/695
The Justices of the Peace (Commission Areas) (Amendment) Order 2001 SI 2001/696
The Children and Family Court Advisory and Support Service (Provision of Grants) Regulations 2001 SI 2001/697
The Children and Family Court Advisory and Support Service (Conduct of Litigation and Exercise of Rights of Audience) Regulations 2001 SI 2001/698
The Children and Family Court Advisory and Support Service (Membership, Committee and Procedure) (Amendment) Regulations 2001 SI 2001/699

701-800
The M11 London–Cambridge Motorway (Redbridge–Stump Cross Section) Scheme 1970 (Revocation) Scheme 2001 SI 2001/701
The M11 Motorway (Junction 8) Connecting Roads Scheme 2001 SI 2001/702
The Court Funds (Amendment) Rules 2001 SI 2001/703
The Public Record Office (Fees) Regulations 2001 SI 2001/704
The National Health Service (General Dental Services) Amendment (No. 2) Regulations 2001 SI 2001/705
The National Health Service (General Medical Services) Amendment Regulations 2001 SI 2001/706
The National Health Service (Dental Charges) Amendment Regulations 2001 SI 2001/707
The North and East Devon Health Authority (Transfer of Trust Property) Order 2001 SI 2001/708
The Special Trustees for the Great Ormond Street Hospital for Children (Transfer of Trust Property) Order 2001 SI 2001/709
The Special Trustees for the Royal London Hospital (Transfer of Trust Property) Order 2001 SI 2001/710
The Special Trustees for St. Bartholomew's Hospital (Transfer of Trust Property) Order 2001 SI 2001/711
The Royal Brompton and Harefield National Health Service Trust (Transfer of Trust Property) Order 2001 SI 2001/712
The National Treatment Agency (Establishment and Constitution) Order 2001 SI 2001/713
The Rampton Hospital Authority (Abolition) Order 2001 SI 2001/714
The National Treatment Agency Regulations 2001 SI 2001/715
The Calderdale Healthcare and the Huddersfield Health Care Services National Health Service Trusts (Dissolution) Order 2001 SI 2001/716
The Calderdale and Huddersfield National Health Service Trust (Establishment) Order 2001 SI 2001/717
The Wrightington, Wigan and Leigh National Health Service Trust (Establishment) Order 2001 SI 2001/718
The Wigan and Leigh Health Services and the Wrightington Hospital National Health Service Trusts (Dissolution) Order 2001 SI 2001/719
The Education (School Teachers' Pay and Conditions) Order 2001 SI 2001/720
The Income Support (General) Amendment Regulations 2001 SI 2001/721
The Local Authorities (Companies) (Amendment) (England) Order 2001 SI 2001/722
The Local Authorities (Capital Finance, Approved Investments and Contracts—Amendment) (England) Regulations 2001 SI 2001/723
The Local Government (Best Value) Performance Indicators and Performance Standards Order 2001 SI 2001/724
The Gaming Act (Variation of Fees) (England and Wales) Order 2001 SI 2001/725
The Gaming Act (Variation of Fees) (England and Wales and Scotland) Order 2001 SI 2001/726
The Gaming (Bingo) Act (Fees) (Amendment) Order 2001 SI 2001/727
The Lotteries (Gaming Board Fees) Order 2001 SI 2001/728
The Export of Goods (Control) (Amendment) Order 2001 SI 2001/729
The Wireless Telegraphy (Exemption) (Amendment) Regulations 2001 SI 2001/730
The Care Standards Act 2000 (Commencement 3) (England) Order 2001 SI 2001/731
The Value Added Tax (Protective Helmets) Order 2001 SI 2001/732
The Inner London Court Staff Pensions Order 2001 SI 2001/733
The Greater London Magistrates' Courts Authority (Accounts and Audit) Regulations 2001 SI 2001/734
The Value Added Tax (Business Gifts of Small Value) Order 2001 SI 2001/735
The Value Added Tax (Consideration for Fuel Provided for Private Use) Order 2001 SI 2001/736
The Central Rating Lists (England) (Amendment) Regulations 2001 SI 2001/737
The Housing Renewal Grants (Amendment) (England) Regulations 2001 SI 2001/739
The Health Authorities (Establishment and Abolition) (England) Order 2001 SI 2001/740
The National Health Service (Travelling Expenses and Remission of Charges) Amendment Regulations 2001 SI 2001/742
The Retained Organs Commission (Establishment and Constitution) Order 2001 SI 2001/743
The Protection of Children (Access to Lists) (Prescribed Individuals) (Amendment) Regulations 2001 SI 2001/744
The Primary Care Trusts (Functions) (England) Amendment Regulations 2001 SI 2001/745
The National Health Service (Charges for Drugs and Appliances) Amendment Regulations 2001 SI 2001/746
The National Health Service (Functions of Health Authorities and Administration Arrangements) (England) Regulations 2001 SI 2001/747
The Retained Organs Commission Regulations 2001 SI 2001/748
The National Health Service (Optical Charges and Payments) Amendment Regulations 2001 SI 2001/749
The Meat (Hygiene and Inspection) (Charges) (Amendment) (England) Regulations 2001 SI 2001/750
Health Authorities (Membership and Procedure) Amendment (England) Regulations 2001 SI 2001/751
The Value Added Tax (Passenger Vehicles) Order 2001 SI 2001/753
The Value Added Tax (Vehicles Designed or Adapted for Handicapped Persons) Order 2001 SI 2001/754
The Transport Act 2000 (Extinguishment of Loans) (Civil Aviation Authority) Order 2001 SI 2001/755
The Government Resources and Accounts Act 2000 (Investment by Devolved Administrations) (Public-Private Partnership Business) Order 2001 SI 2001/756
The Gaming Act (Variation of Monetary Limits) Order 2001 SI 2001/757
The Welfare Food (Amendment) Regulations 2001 SI 2001/758
The Value Added Tax (Electronic Communications) (Incentives) Regulations 2001 SI 2001/759
The Local Authorities (Referendums) (Petitions and Directions) (England) (Amendment) Regulations 2001 SI 2001/760
The Insolvency Fees (Amendment) Order 2001 SI 2001/761
The Insolvency (Amendment) Regulations 2001 SI 2001/762
The Insolvency (Amendment) Rules 2001 SI 2001/763
The Insolvent Companies (Reports on Conduct of Directors) (Amendment) Rules 2001 SI 2001/764
The Insolvent Companies (Disqualification of Unfit Directors) Proceedings (Amendment) Rules 2001  SI 2001/765
The Insolvency Act 2000 (Commencement 1 and Transitional Provisions) Order 2001 SI 2001/766
The Insolvent Partnerships (Amendment) Order 2001 SI 2001/767
The Insolvent Companies (Reports on Conduct of Directors) (Scotland) (Amendment) Rules 2001 SI 2001/768
The Social Security (Crediting and Treatment of Contributions, and National Insurance Numbers) Regulations 2001 SI 2001/769
The Local Government Pension Scheme (Miscellaneous) Regulations 2001 SI 2001/770
The Oxfordshire Community Health National Health Service Trust (Dissolution) Order 2001 SI 2001/771
The Wireless Telegraphy (Television Licence Fees) (Amendment) Regulations 2001 SI 2001/772
The Blood Tests (Evidence of Paternity) (Amendment) Regulations 2001 SI 2001/773
The Child Support, Pensions and Social Security Act 2000 (Commencement 7) Order 2001 SI 2001/774
The Children (Allocation of Proceedings) (Amendment) Order 2001 SI 2001/775
The Magistrates' Courts (Blood Tests) (Amendment) Rules 2001 SI 2001/776
The Family Law Reform Act 1987 (Commencement 3) Order 2001 SI 2001/777
The Family Proceedings Courts (Family Law Act 1986) Rules 2001 SI 2001/778
The Legal Aid Board (Abolition) Order 2001 SI 2001/779
The Relocation Grants (Form of Application) (Amendment) (England) Regulations 2001 SI 2001/780
The West Oxfordshire College (Dissolution) Order 2001 SI 2001/781
The Education (Publication of Draft Proposals and Orders) (Further Education Corporations) (England) Regulations 2001 SI 2001/782
The Learning and Skills Act 2000 (Consequential Amendments) (Schools) (England) Regulations 2001 SI 2001/783
The Portsmouth City Primary Care Trust (Establishment) Order 2001 SI 2001/784
The Rail Vehicle Accessibility (Midland Metro T69 Vehicles) Exemption Order 2001 SI 2001/785
The Local Probation Boards (Miscellaneous Provisions) Regulations 2001 SI 2001/786
The Road Traffic (Permitted Parking Area and Special Parking Area) (City of Plymouth) Order 2001 SI 2001/787
The Street Works (Inspection Fees) (Amendment) (England) Regulations 2001 SI 2001/788
The Housing Renewal Grants (Prescribed Form and Particulars) (Amendment) (England) Regulations 2001 SI 2001/789
The County of Cumbria (Electoral Changes) (Amendment) Order 2001 SI 2001/790
The Special Trustees for the Former United Birmingham Hospitals (Transfer of Trust Property) Revocation Order 2001 SI 2001/791
The Special Trustees for the Former United Birmingham Hospitals (Transfer of Trust Property)2 Order 2001 SI 2001/792
The National Health Service Appointments Commission (Establishment and Constitution) Order 2001 SI 2001/793
The National Health Service Appointments Commission Regulations 2001 SI 2001/794
The Medicines for Human Use and Medical Devices (Fees and Miscellaneous Amendments) Regulations 2001 SI 2001/795
The Education Maintenance Allowance and School Access Funds (England) Grants Regulations 2001 SI 2001/797
The School Organisation Proposals by the Learning and Skills Council for England Regulations 2001 SI 2001/798
The Post–16 Education and Training Inspection Regulations 2001 SI 2001/799
The Education (Bursaries for School Teacher Training Pilot Scheme) (England) (Amendment) Regulations 2001 SI 2001/800

801-900
The A638 Trunk Road (North of Doncaster, St Mary's To Redhouse) (Detrunking) Order 2001 SI 2001/801
The Air Passenger Duty (Designated Region of the United Kingdom) Order 2001 SI 2001/808
The Air Passenger Duty (Connected Flights) (Amendment) Order 2001 SI 2001/809
The Capital Allowances (Corresponding Northern Ireland Grants) Order 2001 SI 2001/810
The Credit Unions (Increase in Limits on Deposits by persons too young to be members and of Periods for the Repayment of Loans) Order 2001 SI 2001/811
The Insurance (Fees) Regulations 2001 SI 2001/812
The Industrial and Provident Societies (Fees) Regulations 2001 SI 2001/813
The Industrial and Provident Societies (Credit Unions) (Fees) Regulations 2001 SI 2001/814
The Building Societies (General Charge and Fees) Regulations 2001 SI 2001/815
The Friendly Societies (General Charge and Fees) Regulations 2001 SI 2001/816
The Specified Risk Material (Amendment) (England) Regulations 2001 SI 2001/817
The Family Proceedings Courts (Children Act 1989) (Amendment) Rules 2001 SI 2001/818
The Adoption (Amendment) Rules 2001 SI 2001/819
The Magistrates' Courts (Adoption) (Amendment) Rules 2001 SI 2001/820
The Family Proceedings (Amendment) Rules 2001 SI 2001/821
The Community Legal Service (Costs) (Amendment) Regulations 2001 SI 2001/822
The Community Legal Service (Cost Protection) (Amendment) Regulations 2001 SI 2001/823
The Court of Protection Rules 2001 SI 2001/824
The Court of Protection (Enduring Powers of Attorney) Rules 2001 SI 2001/825
The Education Standards Fund (England) Regulations 2001 SI 2001/826
The Education (School Performance Targets) (England) (Amendment) Regulations 2001 SI 2001/827
The Local Education Authority (Behaviour Support) (Amendment) (England) Regulations 2001 SI 2001/828
The Legal Advice and Assistance (Amendment 2) Regulations 2001 SI 2001/829
The Legal Aid in Family Proceedings (Remuneration) (Amendment) Regulations 2001 SI 2001/830
The Community Legal Service (Funding) (Amendment) Order 2001 SI 2001/831
The Education (Pupil Records) (Wales) Regulations 2001 SI 2001/832
The National Health Service (General Medical Services) Amendment (Wales) Regulations 2001 SI 2001/833
The Broadmoor Hospital Authority (Abolition) Order 2001 SI 2001/834
The Parliamentary Pensions (Amendment) Regulations 2001 SI 2001/835
The Air Passenger Duty (Amendment) Regulations 2001 SI 2001/836
The Aircraft Operators (Accounts and Records) (Amendment) Regulations 2001 SI 2001/837
The Climate Change Levy (General) Regulations 2001 SI 2001/838
The Valuation for Rating (Plant and Machinery) (England) (Amendment) Regulations 2001 SI 2001/846
The Rail Vehicle Accessibility (Gatwick Express Class 460 Vehicles) Exemption Order 2001 SI 2001/847
The Rail Vehicle Accessibility (South West Trains Class 458 Vehicles) Exemption Order 2001 SI 2001/848
The Road Traffic (Permitted Parking Area and Special Parking Area) (County of Wiltshire) (District of Salisbury) Order 2001 SI 2001/849
The Criminal Justice and Court Services Act 2000 (Approved Premises) Regulations 2001 SI 2001/850
Public Order, Northern Ireland The Public Processions (Northern Ireland) Act 1998 (Accounts and Audit) Order 1998 SI 2001/851
The Public Processions (Northern Ireland) Act 1998 (Accounts and Audit) Order 2001 SI 2001/852
The Transport Act 2000 (Civil Aviation Authority Pension Scheme) Order 2001 SI 2001/853
The Criminal Defence Service (Funding) Order 2001 SI 2001/855
The Criminal Defence Service (Recovery of Defence Costs Orders) Regulations 2001 SI 2001/856
The Legal Services Commission (Disclosure of Information) (Amendment) Regulations 2001 SI 2001/857
The National Savings Bank (Amendment) Regulations 2001 SI 2001/858
The Social Security (Miscellaneous Amendments) (No. 3) Regulations 2001 SI 2001/859
The Extensification Payment Regulations 2001 SI 2001/864
The Immigration (European Economic Area) (Amendment) Regulations 2001 SI 2001/865
The Redundancy Payments (Continuity of Employment in Local Government, etc.) (Modification) (Amendment) Order 2001 SI 2001/866
The Immigration and Asylum Appeals (One-Stop Procedure) (Amendment) Regulations 2001 SI 2001/867
The Immigration and Asylum Appeals (Notices) (Amendment) Regulations 2001 SI 2001/868
The Transport Act 2000 (Commencement 5) Order 2001 SI 2001/869
The Education (Amount to Follow Permanently Excluded Pupil) (Amendment) (England) Regulations 2001 SI 2001/870
The Teachers' Pensions (Amendment) Regulations 2001 SI 2001/871
The European Social Fund (National Assembly for Wales) Regulations 2001 SI 2001/872
The Postal Services Act 2000 (Commencement 3 and Transitional and Saving Provisions) Order 2001 SI 2001/878
The Import and Export Restrictions (Foot-And-Mouth Disease) (No. 2) (Wales) Regulations 2001 SI 2001/879
The Biocidal Products Regulations 2001 SI 2001/880
The Import and Export Restrictions (Foot-and-Mouth Disease) (No. 3) Regulations 2001 SI 2001/886
The Foot-and-Mouth Disease (Export of Vehicles) (Disinfection of Tyres) Regulations 2001 SI 2001/887
The North Cumbria Mental Health and Learning Disabilities National Health Service Trust (Establishment) Order 2001 SI 2001/888
The Education (National Curriculum) (Key Stage 3 Assessment Arrangements) (Wales) (Amendment) Order 2001 SI 2001/889
The Education (Individual Pupils' Achievements) (Information) (Wales) (Amendment) Regulations 2001 SI 2001/890
The Education (Education Standards Grants) (Wales) Regulations 2001 SI 2001/891
The Tax Credits (Miscellaneous Amendments 3) Regulations 2001 SI 2001/892
The Tax Credits (Miscellaneous Amendments 3) (Northern Ireland) Regulations 2001 SI 2001/893
The Road Traffic (Permitted Parking Area and Special Parking Area) (City of Salford) Order 2001 SI 2001/894
The Professions Supplementary to Medicine (Registration Rules) (Amendment) Order of Council 2001 SI 2001/896

901-1000
The Financing of Maintained Schools (England) (Amendment) Regulations 2001 SI 2001/907
The Individual Savings Account (Amendment) Regulations 2001 SI 2001/908
The Local Government Best Value (Exclusion of Non-commercial Considerations) Order 2001 SI 2001/909
The Social Security Benefits Up-rating Regulations 2001 SI 2001/910
The Social Security (Industrial Injuries) (Dependency) (Permitted Earnings Limits) Order 2001 SI 2001/911
The Access to Justice Act 1999 (Commencement 7, Transitional Provisions and Savings) Order 2001 SI 2001/916
The Rules of the Air (Amendment) Regulations 2001 SI 2001/917
The Air Navigation (Dangerous Goods) (Amendment) Regulations 2001 SI 2001/918
The Criminal Justice and Court Services Act 2000 (Commencement 4) Order 2001 SI 2001/919
The Deregulation (Sunday Licensing) Order 2001 SI 2001/920
The Licensing (Special Hours Certificates) (Amendment) Rules 2001 SI 2001/921
The Buying Agency Trading Fund (Amendment) (Change of Name) Order 2001 SI 2001/922
The Personal Equity Plan (Amendment) Regulations 2001 ( SI 2001/923
The Fixed Penalty (Procedure) (Amendment) Regulations 2001 SI 2001/926
The Limited Liability Partnerships (Forms) Regulations 2001 SI 2001/927
The Billericay, Brentwood and Wickford Primary Care Trust (Establishment) Order 2001 SI 2001/928
The Maldon and South Chelmsford Primary Care Trust (Establishment) Order 2001 SI 2001/929
The North Hampshire, Loddon Community National Health Service Trust (Dissolution) Order 2001 SI 2001/930
The Newcastle upon Tyne Hospitals National Health Service Trust (Establishment) Amendment Order 2001 SI 2001/931
The City and Hackney Community Services, the Newham Community Health Services and the Tower Hamlets Healthcare National Health Service Trusts (Dissolution) Order 2001 SI 2001/932
The Welfare Reform and Pensions Act 1999 (Commencement10, and Transitional Provisions) Order 2001 SI 2001/933
The Stakeholder Pension Schemes (Amendment) (No.2) Regulations 2001 SI 2001/934
The Pig Industry Development Scheme 2000 (Confirmation) Order 2001 SI 2001/935
The Vehicle Excise Duty (Immobilisation, Removal and Disposal of Vehicles) (Amendment) Regulations 2001 SI 2001/936
The Motor Vehicles (Driving Licences) (Amendment) (No. 3) Regulations 2001 SI 2001/937
The Occupational and Personal Pension Schemes (Perpetuities and Contracting-out) Amendment Regulations 2001 SI 2001/943
The Social Security (Hospital In-Patients) Amendment Regulations 2001 SI 2001/944
The A650 Trunk Road (Drighlington Bypass) (Detrunking) Order 2001 SI 2001/945
The Liberia (United Nations Sanctions) (Overseas Territories) Order 2001 SI 2001/946
The Liberia (United Nations Sanctions) Order 2001 SI 2001/947
The Liberia (United Nations Sanctions) (Isle of Man) Order 2001 SI 2001/948
The Liberia (United Nations Sanctions) (Channel Islands) Order 2001 SI 2001/949
The Community Legal Service (Financial) (Amendment) Regulations 2001 SI 2001/950
The Education (Student Support) Regulations 2001 SI 2001/951
The Proceeds of Crime (Scotland) Act 1995 (Enforcement of Scottish Confiscation Orders in England and Wales) Order 2001 SI 2001/953
The Scotland Act 1998 (Transfer of Functions to the Scottish Ministers etc.) Order 2001 SI 2001/954
The Education (Inspectors of Schools in England) Order 2001 SI 2001/955
The Drug Trafficking Act 1994 (Designated Countries and Territories) (Amendment) Order 2001 SI 2001/956
The Criminal Justice (International Co-operation) Act 1990 (Enforcement of Overseas Forfeiture Orders) (Amendment) Order 2001 SI 2001/957
The Maximum Number of Judges (Northern Ireland) Order 2001 SI 2001/958
The Sea Fish (Conservation) (Channel Islands) (Amendment) Order 2001 SI 2001/959
The Criminal Justice Act 1988 (Designated Countries and Territories) (Amendment) Order 2001 SI 2001/960
The European Communities (Designation) Order 2001 SI 2001/961
The European Convention on Extradition Order 2001 SI 2001/962
The EUTELSAT (Immunities and Privileges) (Amendment) Order 2001 SI 2001/963
The Stamp Duty and Stamp Duty Reserve Tax (Definition of Unit Trust Scheme and Open-ended Investment Company) Regulations 2001 SI 2001/964
The Social Security Contributions and Benefits (Northern Ireland) Act 1992 (Modification of Section 10(7)) Regulations 2001 SI 2001/965
The Social Security Contributions and Benefits Act 1992 (Modification of Section 10(7)) Regulations 2001 SI 2001/966
The Companies (Disqualification Orders) Regulations 2001 SI 2001/967
The Foot-and-Mouth Disease (Amendment) (Wales) (No. 3) Order 2001 SI 2001/968
The Limited Liability Partnerships (Fees) (No. 2) Regulations 2001 SI 2001/969
New Deal (Miscellaneous Provisions) Order 2001 SI 2001/970
The Education (Student Loans) (Repayment) (Amendment) Regulations 2001 SI 2001/971
The Birmingham (Kitts Green and Shard End) Education Action Zone (Variation) Order 2001 SI 2001/972
The Bristol Education Action Zone (Variation) Order 2001 SI 2001/973
The Foot-and-Mouth Disease (Amendment) (England) (No. 3) Order 2001 SI 2001/974
The Milk and Milk Products (Pupils in Educational Establishments) (England) Regulations 2001 SI 2001/994
The Financial Services and Markets Act 2000 (Recognition Requirements for Investment Exchanges and Clearing Houses) Regulations 2001 SI 2001/995
The Financial Services and Markets Act 2000 (Prescribed Markets and Qualifying Investments) Order 2001 SI 2001/996
The Jobseeker's Allowance (Members of the Forces) (Joint Claims: Consequential Amendments) Regulations (Northern Ireland) 2001 SI 2001/998
The Public Processions (Northern Ireland) Act 1998 (Accounts and Audit) Order (No. 2) 2001 SI 2001/999
The Epicentre LEAP Ellesmere Port Cheshire Education Action Zone (Amendment) Order 2001 SI 2001/1000

1001-1100
The Workmen's Compensation (Supplementation) (Amendment) Scheme 2001 SI 2001/1001
The Housing Benefit and Council Tax Benefit (Decisions and Appeals) Regulations 2001 SI 2001/1002
The Local Authorities (Changing Executive Arrangements and Alternative Arrangements) (England) Regulations 2001 SI 2001/1003
The Social Security (Contributions) Regulations 2001 SI 2001/1004
The National Assistance (Sums for Personal Requirements) (England) Regulations 2001 SI 2001/1005
The Injuries in War (Shore Employments) Compensation (Amendment) Scheme 2001 SI 2001/1015
The Borough of Rushmoor (Electoral Changes) Order 2001 SI 2001/1016
The District of East Hampshire (Electoral Changes) Order 2001 SI 2001/1017
The Borough of Test Valley (Electoral Changes) Order 2001 SI 2001/1018
The Borough of Basingstoke and Deane (Electoral Changes) Order 2001 SI 2001/1019
The Borough of Fareham (Electoral Changes) Order 2001 SI 2001/1020
The Borough of Eastleigh (Parishes and Electoral Changes) Order 2001 SI 2001/1021
The Borough of Gosport (Electoral Changes) Order 2001 SI 2001/1022
The District of Hart (Parishes and Electoral Changes) Order 2001 SI 2001/1023
The City of Southampton (Electoral Changes) Order 2001 SI 2001/1024
The Borough of Havant (Electoral Changes) Order 2001 SI 2001/1025
The District of New Forest (Parishes and Electoral Changes) Order 2001 SI 2001/1026
The City of Portsmouth (Electoral Changes) Order 2001 SI 2001/1027
The City of Winchester (Electoral Changes) Order 2001 SI 2001/1028
The Social Security Amendment (New Deal) Regulations 2001 SI 2001/1029
The Education (Nursery Education Training Grant) (England) Regulations 2001 SI 2001/1030
The Pensions Appeal Tribunals (Additional Rights of Appeal) Regulations 2001 SI 2001/1031
The Pensions Appeal Tribunals (Late Appeals) Regulations 2001 SI 2001/1032
The Foot-and-Mouth Disease (Amendment) (Wales) (No. 4) Order 2001 SI 2001/1033
The Import and Export Restrictions (Foot-And-Mouth Disease) (No. 3) (Wales) Regulations 2001 SI 2001/1034
The Local Probation Boards (Appointments and Miscellaneous Provisions) Regulations 2001 SI 2001/1035
The National Care Standards Commission (Membership and Procedure) Regulations 2001 SI 2001/1042
The Road Vehicles (Construction and Use) (Amendment) (No. 2) Regulations 2001 SI 2001/1043
The British Waterways Board (Limit for Borrowing) Order 2001 SI 2001/1054
The Notification of New Substances (Amendment) Regulations 2001 SI 2001/1055
The Regulation of Investigatory Powers (British Broadcasting Corporation) Order 2001 SI 2001/1057
The Financial Services and Markets Act 2000 (Promotion of Collective Investment Schemes) (Exemptions) Order 2001 SI 2001/1060
The Financial Services Act 1986 (Exemption) Order 2001 SI 2001/1061
The Financial Services and Markets Act 2000 (Collective Investment Schemes) Order 2001 SI 2001/1062
The National Assistance (Assessment of Resources) (Amendment) (No. 2) (England) Regulations 2001 SI 2001/1066
The National Health Service (Professions Supplementary to Medicine) Amendment (Wales) Regulations 2001 SI 2001/1075
The Community Charges, Council Tax and Non-Domestic Rating (Enforcement) (Magistrates' Courts) (Wales) Regulations 2001 SI 2001/1076
The Community Legal Service (Funding) (Counsel in Family Proceedings) Order 2001 SI 2001/1077
The Foot-and-Mouth Disease (Amendment) (England) (No. 4) Order 2001 SI 2001/1078
The Road Vehicles (Display of Registration Marks) (Amendment) Regulations 2001 SI 2001/1079
The Import and Export Restrictions (Foot-And-Mouth Disease) (No. 4) Regulations 2001 SI 2001/1080
The Income Tax (Electronic Communications) (Miscellaneous Amendments) Regulations 2001 SI 2001/1081
The Tax Credits (Miscellaneous Amendments 4) Regulations 2001 SI 2001/1082
The Tax Credits (Miscellaneous Amendments 4) (Northern Ireland) Regulations 2001 SI 2001/1083
National Health Service (General Ophthalmic Services) Amendment Regulations 2001 SI 2001/1084
The Social Security (Inherited SERPS) Regulations 2001 SI 2001/1085
The Portsmouth Harbour (Gunwharf Quays) (Millennium Tower) Order 2001 SI 2001/1086
Limited Liability Partnerships Regulations 2001 SI 2001/1090
The Offshore Combustion Installations (Prevention and Control of Pollution) Regulations 2001 SI 2001/1091
The Social Security Commissioners (Procedure) (Amendment) Regulations 2001 SI 2001/1095
The Licensing (Amendment of Various Rules) Rules 2001 SI 2001/1096
The Police Act 1997 (Commencement 7) Order 2001 SI 2001/1097
The Order Prescribing Forms under the Licensing Act 1902 (Amendment) Order 2001 SI 2001/1098
The Isles of Scilly (Sale of Intoxicating Liquor) (Amendment) Order 2001 SI 2001/1099

1101-1200
The Part-time Workers (Prevention of Less Favourable Treatment) Regulations 2001 SI 2001/1107
The National Minimum Wage Regulations 1999 (Amendment) Regulations 2001 SI 2001/1108
The Education (Pupil Registration) (Amendment) (Wales) Regulations 2001 SI 2001/1109
The School Governors' Annual Reports (Wales) Regulations 2001 SI 2001/1110
The Education (School Information) (Wales) (Amendment) Regulations 2001 SI 2001/1111
The Plant Protection Products (Amendment) Regulations 2001 SI 2001/1112
The Pesticides (Maximum Residue Levels in Crops, Food and Feeding Stuffs) (England and Wales) (Amendment) Regulations 2001 SI 2001/1113
The Fees for Certificates of Arrest and Surrender of Deserters and Absentees (Army and Air Force) (Amendment) Regulations 2001 SI 2001/1115
The Certificates of Arrest and Surrender (Royal Navy) (Amendment) Regulations 2001 SI 2001/1116
The Fisheries and Aquaculture Structures (Grants) (England) Regulations 2001 SI 2001/1117
The Social Security Amendment (Capital Disregards and Recovery of Benefits) Regulations 2001 SI 2001/1118
The Industrial Training Levy (Construction Board) Order 2001 SI 2001/1120
The Industrial Training Levy (Engineering Construction Board) Order 2001 SI 2001/1121
The Capital Gains Tax (Gilt-edged Securities) Order 2001 SI 2001/1122
The Income Tax (Car Benefits) (Reduction of Value of Appropriate Percentage) Regulations 2001 SI 2001/1123
The National Assistance (Assessment of Resources) (Amendment) (No. 3) (England) Regulations 2001 SI 2001/1124
The Road Vehicles (Authorised Weight) (Amendment) Regulations 2001 SI 2001/1125
The Regulation of Investigatory Powers (Designation of Public Authorities for the Purposes of Intrusive Surveillance) Order 2001 SI 2001/1126
The Foot-And-Mouth Disease (Ascertainment of Value) (Wales) Order 2001 SI 2001/1127
The Employment Appeal Tribunal (Amendment) Rules 2001 SI 2001/1128
The Housing Benefit (Permitted Totals) (Amendment) Order 2001 SI 2001/1129
The Council Tax Benefit (Permitted Totals) (Amendment) Order 2001 SI 2001/1130
The General Optical Council (Registration and Enrolment (Amendment) Rules) Order of Council 2001 SI 2001/1131
The Postal Services Act 2000 (Determination of Turnover for Penalties) Order 2001 SI 2001/1135
The Climate Change Levy (Electricity and Gas) Regulations 2001 SI 2001/1136
The Climate Change Levy (Solid Fuel) Regulations 2001 SI 2001/1137
The Climate Change Levy (Use as Fuel) Regulations 2001 SI 2001/1138
The Climate Change Agreements (Energy-intensive Installations) Regulations 2001 SI 2001/1139
The Climate Change Levy (Combined Heat and Power Stations) Prescribed Conditions and Efficiency Percentages Regulations 2001 SI 2001/1140
The Tax Credits Up-rating Order 2001 SI 2001/1141
The Foot-And-Mouth Disease (Ascertainment of Value) (Wales) (No.2) Order 2001 SI 2001/1142
The Criminal Defence Service (Funding) (Amendment) Order 2001 SI 2001/1143
The Criminal Defence Service (General) Regulations 2001 SI 2001/1144
The Postal Services Act 2000 (Commencement 4 and Transitional and Saving Provisions) Order 2001 SI 2001/1148
The Postal Services Act 2000 (Consequential Modifications 1) Order 2001 SI 2001/1149
The National Health Service Trusts (Cardiff and Vale National Health Service Trust) (Originating Capital) (Wales) Order 2001 SI 2001/1153
The Tir Mynydd (Cross-border Holdings) (Wales) Regulations 2001 SI 2001/1154
The Double Taxation Relief (Taxes on Income) (Underlying Tax on Dividends and Dual Resident Companies) Regulations 2001 SI 2001/1156
The Prison Service (Pay Review Body) Regulations 2001 SI 2001/1161
The A43 Trunk Road (M1 Junction 15A Enhancement) Order 2001 SI 2001/1162
The Double Taxation Relief (Surrender of Relievable Tax Within a Group) Regulations 2001 SI 2001/1163
The A12 London–Great Yarmouth Trunk Road (A12/A14 Seven Hills Roundabout to South of Bascule Bridge) Detrunking Order 2001 SI 2001/1164
The Defence Aviation Repair Agency Trading Fund Order 2001 SI 2001/1165
The A140 North of Ipswich to Norwich Trunk Road (A14 Coddenham to A47 Norwich Southern Bypass) Detrunking Order 2001 SI 2001/1166
The Discretionary Financial Assistance Regulations 2001 SI 2001/1167
The Criminal Defence Service (Representation Order Appeals) Regulations 2001 SI 2001/1168
The Criminal Defence Service (Choice in Very High Cost Cases) Regulations 2001 SI 2001/1169
The Employment Tribunals (Constitution and Rules of Procedure) (Scotland) Regulations 2001 SI 2001/1170
The Employment Tribunals (Constitution and Rules of Procedure) Regulations 2001 SI 2001/1171
The West of Cornwall Primary Care Trust (Establishment) Order 2001 SI 2001/1175
The Foot-And-Mouth Disease (Ascertainment of Value) (Wales) (No. 3) Order 2001 SI 2001/1176
The Financial Services and Markets Act 2000 (Carrying on Regulated Activities by Way of Business) Order 2001 SI 2001/1177
The National Health Service (General Medical Services) Amendment (No. 2) Regulations 2001 SI 2001/1178
The Land Registration Fees Order 2001 SI 2001/1179
The Legal Aid in Criminal and Care Proceedings (Costs) (Amendment) Regulations 2001 SI 2001/1180
The Legal Advice and Assistance at Police Stations (Remuneration) (Amendment) Regulations 2001 SI 2001/1181
The Legal Advice and Assistance (Amendment 3) Regulations 2001 SI 2001/1182
The Pensions Appeal Tribunals (England and Wales) (Amendment 2) Rules 2001 SI 2001/1183
The European Parliamentary Elections (Franchise of Relevant Citizens of the Union) Regulations 2001 SI 2001/1184
The ACAS Arbitration Scheme (England and Wales) Order 2001 SI 2001/1185
The Unfair Terms in Consumer Contracts (Amendment) Regulations 2001 SI 2001/1186
The Employment Relations Act 1999 (Commencement 8) Order 2001 SI 2001/1187
The Employment Protection (Continuity of Employment) (Amendment) Regulations 2001 SI 2001/1188
The Social Security (Claims and Information and Work-focused Interviews for Lone Parents) Amendment Regulations 2001 SI 2001/1189
The Housing Benefit (General) Amendment (No.2) Regulations 2001 SI 2001/1190
The Import and Export Restrictions (Foot-and-Mouth Disease) (No. 4) (Amendment) Regulations 2001 SI 2001/1191
The Rehabilitation of Offenders Act 1974 (Exceptions) (Amendment) Order 2001 SI 2001/1192
The Care Standards Act 2000 (Commencement 4) (England) Order 2001 SI 2001/1193
The Police Act 1997 (Criminal Records) (Registration) Regulations 2001 SI 2001/1194
The School Standards and Framework Act 1998 (Commencement 8 and Supplemental Provisions) Order 2001 SI 2001/1195
The Foot-and-Mouth Disease (Export of Vehicles) (Disinfection of Tyres) (Amendment) Regulations 2001 SI 2001/1196
The King's Mill Centre for Health Care Services National Health Service Trust Change of Name and (Establishment) Amendment Order 2001 SI 2001/1197
The West Hampshire National Health Service Trust (Establishment) Order 2001 SI 2001/1198
The Merger (Fees) (Amendment) Regulations 2001 SI 2001/1199
The Fossil Fuel Levy (Amendment) Regulations 2001 SI 2001/1200

1201-1300
The Financial Services and Markets Act 2000 (Exemption) Order 2001 SI 2001/1201
The Import and Export Restrictions (Foot-And-Mouth Disease) (No. 3) (Wales) (Amendment) Regulations 2001 SI 2001/1202
The Non-Domestic Rating (Alteration of Lists and Appeals) (Amendment) (Wales) Regulations 2001 SI 2001/1203
The Elections (Welsh Forms) Order 2001 SI 2001/1204
The Weighing Equipment (Beltweighers) Regulations 2001 SI 2001/1208
The Further Education Teachers' Qualifications (England) Regulations 2001 SI 2001/1209
The Care Standards Act 2000 (Commencement 5) (England) Order 2001 SI 2001/1210
The Teaching and Higher Education Act 1998 (Commencement 8) Order 2001 SI 2001/1211
The Education (Pupil Information) (England) (Amendment) Regulations 2001 SI 2001/1212
The General Teaching Council for England (Additional Functions) Order 2001 SI 2001/1214
The Education Act 1997 (Commencement 4) Order 2001 SI 2001/1215
The Human Rights Act (Amendment) Order 2001 SI 2001/1216
The Financial Services and Markets Act 2000 (Appointed Representatives) Regulations 2001 SI 2001/1217
The Occupational Pension Schemes (Pensions Compensation Provisions) Amendment Regulations 2001 SI 2001/1218
The Welfare Reform and Pensions Act 1999 (Commencement 11) Order 2001 SI 2001/1219
The Suffolk (Coroners' Districts) Order 2001 SI 2001/1220
The Nottingham Community Health National Health Service Trust (Dissolution) Order 2001 SI 2001/1221
The Road Traffic (Owner Liability) (Amendment) (No. 2) Regulations 2001 SI 2001/1222
The Nottingham Healthcare and the Central Nottinghamshire Healthcare National Health Service Trusts (Dissolution) Order 2001 SI 2001/1223
The South Buckinghamshire National Health Service Trust (Establishment) Amendment Order 2001 SI 2001/1224
The Financial Services and Markets Act 2000 (Designated Professional Bodies) Order 2001 SI 2001/1226
The Financial Services and Markets Act 2000 (Professions) (Non-Exempt Activities) Order 2001 SI 2001/1227
The Open-Ended Investment Companies Regulations 2001 SI 2001/1228
The Measuring Equipment (Cold-water Meters) (Amendment) Regulations 2001 SI 2001/1229
The North and East Devon Partnership National Health Service Trust (Establishment) Order 2001 SI 2001/1230
The Smoke Control Areas (Exempted Fireplaces) (Wales) Order 2001 SI 2001/1231
The Food Irradiation Provisions (Wales) Regulations 2001 SI 2001/1232
The Foot-And-Mouth Disease (Amendment) (Wales) (No.4) (Amendment) Order 2001 SI 2001/1234
The Social Security (Widow's Benefit and Retirement Pensions) Amendment Regulations 2001 SI 2001/1235
The Child Support (Civil Imprisonment) (Scotland) Regulations 2001 SI 2001/1236
The Foot-and-Mouth Disease (Amendment) (England) (No. 4) (Amendment) Order 2001 SI 2001/1241
The Foot-and-Mouth Disease (Ascertainment of Value) (No. 4) Order 2001 SI 2001/1242
The Plymouth Community Services National Health Service Trust (Dissolution) Order 2001 SI 2001/1244
The Exeter and District Community Health Service National Health Service Trust (Dissolution) Order 2001 SI 2001/1245
The Defence Science and Technology Laboratory Trading Fund Order 2001 SI 2001/1246
The Dorset Community National Health Service Trust (Dissolution) Order 2001 SI 2001/1247
The Bath and West Community National Health Service Trust (Dissolution) Order 2001 SI 2001/1248
The Essex and Herts Community, the Mid Essex Community and Mental Health, and the North East Essex Mental Health National Health Service Trusts (Dissolution) Order 2001 SI 2001/1249
The Norwich Community Health Partnership National Health Service Trust (Dissolution) Order 2001 SI 2001/1250
The Adoption of Children from Overseas Regulations 2001 SI 2001/1251
The Child Support, Pensions and Social Security Act 2000 (Commencement 8) Order 2001 SI 2001/1252
The Education (School Teachers' Pay and Conditions) (No.2) Order 2001 SI 2001/1254
The Legal Aid in Family Proceedings (Remuneration) (Amendment 2) Regulations 2001 SI 2001/1255
The Criminal Defence Service (Funding) (Amendment 2) Order 2001 SI 2001/1256
The National Health Service Trusts (Originating Capital) Order 2001 SI 2001/1257
The Camden and Islington Mental Health National Health Service Trust (Establishment) Order 2001 SI 2001/1258
The Terrorism Act 2000 (Proscribed Organisations) (Amendment) Order 2001 SI 2001/1261
The Plastic Materials and Articles in Contact with Food (Amendment) (Wales) Regulations 2001 SI 2001/1263
The Housing Benefit and Council Tax Benefit (Decisions and Appeals) (Transitional and Savings) Regulations 2001 SI 2001/1264
The Social Security Pensions (Home Responsibilities) (Amendment) Regulations 2001 SI 2001/1265
The Teachers (Compulsory Registration) (England) Regulations 2001 SI 2001/1266
The General Teaching Council for England (Registration of Teachers) (Amendment 2) Regulations 2001 SI 2001/1267
The General Teaching Council for England (Disciplinary Functions) Regulations 2001 ( SI 2001/1268
Education (Restriction of Employment) (Amendment) Regulations 2001 SI 2001/1269
The General Teaching Council for England (Additional Functions) (Amendment) Order 2001 SI 2001/1270
The Non-Domestic Rating (Alteration of Lists and Appeals) (Amendment) (England) Regulations 2001 SI 2001/1271
The Adoption of Children from Overseas (Wales) Regulations 2001 SI 2001/1272
The Foot-And-Mouth Disease (Ascertainment of Value) (Wales) (No. 4) Order 2001 SI 2001/1273
The Learning and Skills Act 2000 (Commencement 3 and Transitional Provisions) (Wales) Order 2001 SI 2001/1274
The Disabled Facilities Grants and Home Repair Assistance (Maximum Amounts) (Amendment) (Wales) Order 2001 SI 2001/1275
The Adoption (Intercountry Aspects) Act 1999 (Commencement 5) Order 2001 SI 2001/1279
The Local Authorities (Members' Allowances) (England) Regulations 2001 SI 2001/1280
The Street Works (Charges for Unreasonably Prolonged Occupation of the Highway) (England) Regulations 2001 SI 2001/1281
The Financial Services and Markets Act 2000 (Commencement 2) Order 2001 SI 2001/1282
The Financial Services and Markets Act 2000 (Dissolution of the Insurance Brokers Registration Council) (Consequential Provisions) Order 2001 SI 2001/1283
The Education (School Teachers' Pay and Conditions) (No. 3) Order 2001 SI 2001/1284
Education (Teacher Training Hardship Grants) (England) Regulations 2001 SI 2001/1285
The Education (National Curriculum) (Assessment Arrangements) (England) (Amendment) Order 2001 SI 2001/1286
The Local Authorities (Capital Finance) (Rate of Discount for 2001/2002) (Wales) Regulations 2001 SI 2001/1287
The Horizon and the West Herts Community Health National Health Service Trusts (Dissolution) Order 2001 SI 2001/1288
The Mancunian Community Health National Health Service Trust (Dissolution) Order 2001 SI 2001/1289
The Bay Community National Health Service Trust (Dissolution) Order 2001 SI 2001/1290
The Northampton Community Healthcare and the Rockingham Forest National Health Service Trusts (Dissolution) Order 2001 SI 2001/1291
The Transport Act 2000 (Designation of Transferee) Order 2001 SI 2001/1292
The Community Drivers' Hours (Foot-and-Mouth Disease) (Temporary Exception) (No. 2) Regulations 2001 SI 2001/1293
The Northern Ireland Act 1998 (Designation of Public Authorities) Order 2001 SI 2001/1294
The Justices and Justices' Clerks (Costs) Regulations 2001 SI 2001/1296
The Local Authorities (Conduct of Referendums) (England) Regulations 2001 SI 2001/1298
The Local Authorities (Alternative Arrangements) (England) Regulations 2001 SI 2001/1299
The National Health Service (Penalty Charge) (Wales) Regulations 2001 SI 2001/1300

1301-1400
The Housing (Preservation of Right to Buy) (Amendment) (Wales) Regulations 2001 SI 2001/1301
The Meat (Hygiene and Inspection) (Charges) (Amendment) (Wales) Regulations 2001 SI 2001/1302
The Restriction on Pithing (Wales) Regulations 2001 SI 2001/1303
The General Commissioners of Income Tax (Costs) Regulations 2001 SI 2001/1304
The Social Security (Incapacity Benefit) Amendment Regulations 2001 SI 2001/1305
The Local Authorities (Referendums) (Petitions and Directions) (England) (Amendment) (No. 2) Regulations 2001 SI 2001/1310
The Ravensbourne Priority Health National Health Service Trust (Dissolution) Order 2001 SI 2001/1313
The Weights and Measures (Intoxicating Liquor) (Amendment) Order 2001 SI 2001/1322
The Additional Pension and Social Security Pensions (Home Responsibilities) (Amendment) Regulations 2001 SI 2001/1323
The Housing Benefit (General) Amendment (No. 3) Regulations 2001 SI 2001/1324
The Rent Officers (Housing Benefit Functions) (Amendment) Order 2001 SI 2001/1325
The Rent Officers (Housing Benefit Functions) (Scotland) (Amendment) Order 2001 SI 2001/1326
The Electoral Commission (Limit on Public Awareness Expenditure) Order 2001 SI 2001/1329
The Barnet, Enfield and Haringey Mental Health National Health Service Trust (Establishment) Order 2001 SI 2001/1330
The Barnet Community Healthcare, the Enfield Community Care and the Haringey Health Care National Health Service Trusts (Dissolution) Order 2001 SI 2001/1331
The Slaughter Premium (Wales) Regulations 2001 SI 2001/1332
The Tax Credits (New Deal Consequential Amendments) (Northern Ireland) Regulations 2001 SI 2001/1333
The Tax Credits (New Deal Consequential Amendments) Regulations 2001 SI 2001/1334
The Financial Services and Markets Act 2000 (Financial Promotion) Order 2001 SI 2001/1335
The Local Government (Best Value Performance Indicators) (Wales) Order 2001 SI 2001/1337
The South Wales Sea Fisheries District (Variation) 2001 SI 2001/1338
The Education (Adjudicators Inquiry Procedure etc.) (Amendment) Regulations 2001 SI 2001/1339
The Bretton Hall Higher Education Corporation (Dissolution) Order 2001 SI 2001/1340
The Dual-Use Items (Export Control) (Amendment) Regulations 2001 SI 2001/1344
The Non-Domestic Rating (Public Houses and Petrol Filling Stations) (England) Order 2001 SI 2001/1345
The Non-Domestic Rating (Rural Settlements) (England) (Amendment) Order 2001 SI 2001/1346
The Leeds Supertram (Extension) Order 2001 SI 2001/1347
The Leeds Supertram (Land Acquisition and Road Works) Order 2001 SI 2001/1348
The Financial Markets and Insolvency (Settlement Finality) (Revocation) Regulations 2001 SI 2001/1349
The Tax Credits (Miscellaneous Amendments 5) (Northern Ireland) Regulations 2001 SI 2001/1350
The Tax Credits (Miscellaneous Amendments 5) Regulations 2001 SI 2001/1351
The Foot-and-Mouth Disease (Export of Vehicles) (Disinfection of Tyres) (Amendment) (No. 2) Regulations 2001 SI 2001/1352
The Greater London Road Traffic (Various Provisions) Order 2001 SI 2001/1353
The Social Security (Minimum Contributions to Appropriate Personal Pension Schemes) Order 2001 SI 2001/1354
The Social Security (Reduced Rates of Class 1 Contributions, and Rebates) (Money Purchase Contracted-out Schemes) Order 2001 SI 2001/1355
The Social Security (Reduced Rates of Class 1 Contributions) (Salary Related Contracted-out Schemes) Order 2001 SI 2001/1356
The Import and Export Restrictions (Foot-And-Mouth Disease) (Wales) (No.4) Regulations 2001 SI 2001/1357
National Health Service (Charges for Drugs and Appliances) (Wales) Regulations 2001 SI 2001/1358
The National Health Service (General Dental Services) and (Dental Charges) (Amendment) (Wales) Regulations 2001 SI 2001/1359
The Beef Labelling (Enforcement) (Wales) Regulations 2001 SI 2001/1360
The Spreadable Fats (Marketing Standards) (Wales) Regulations 2001 SI 2001/1361
National Health Service (Optical Charges and Payments) and (General Ophthalmic Services) (Amendment) (Wales) Regulations 2001 SI 2001/1362
The Import and Export Restrictions (Foot-And-Mouth Disease) (No. 5) Regulations 2001 SI 2001/1366
The Greater Manchester (Light Rapid Transit System) (Trafford Park) Order 2001 SI 2001/1367
The Greater Manchester (Light Rapid Transit System) (Mumps Surface Crossing) Order 2001 SI 2001/1368
The Greater Manchester (Light Rapid Transit System) (Land Acquisition) Order 2001 SI 2001/1369
Suckler Cow Premium Regulations 2001 SI 2001/1370
The Financial Services (EEA Passport Rights) Regulations 2001 SI 2001/1376
The Waddeton Fishery Order 2001 SI 2001/1380
The Shellfish (Specification of Crustaceans) Regulations 2001 SI 2001/1381
The County Court Fees (Amendment) Order 2001 SI 2001/1385
The Enforcement of Road Traffic Debts (Amendment) Order 2001 SI 2001/1386
The High Court and County Courts Jurisdiction (Amendment) Order 2001 SI 2001/1387
The Civil Procedure (Amendment 2) Rules 2001 SI 2001/1388
The Partnerships (Unrestricted Size) 16 Regulations 2001 SI 2001/1389
The Education (Induction Arrangements for School Teachers) (England) (Amendment 2) Regulations 2001 SI 2001/1390
The Education (Teachers' Qualifications and Health Standards) (England) (Amendment) Regulations 2001 SI 2001/1391
The Teacher Training Agency (Additional Functions) Order 2001 SI 2001/1392
The Immigration and Asylum Act 1999 (Part V Exemption: Eligible Voluntary Bodies and Relevant Employers) Order 2001 SI 2001/1393
The Immigration and Asylum Act 1999 (Commencement 10) Order 2001 SI 2001/1394
The Social Security (Breach of Community Order) Regulations 2001 SI 2001/1395
The National Health Service (Pharmaceutical Services) (Amendment) (Wales) 2001 SI 2001/1396
National Health Service (Travelling Expenses and Remission of Charges) (Amendment) (Wales) Regulations 2001 SI 2001/1397
The Scottish Parliament (Elections etc.) (Amendment) Order 2001 SI 2001/1399
The Scotland Act 1998 (Consequential Modifications) Order 2001 SI 2001/1400

1401-1500
The Relevant Authorities (General Principles) Order 2001 SI 2001/1401
The Southend on Sea Primary Care Trust (Establishment) Amendment Order 2001 SI 2001/1402
The Immigration and Asylum Act 1999 (Part V Exemption: Educational Institutions and Health Sector Bodies) Order 2001 SI 2001/1403
The New Opportunities Fund (Specification of Initiatives) Order 2001 SI 2001/1404
The Education (School Organisation Proposals) (England) (Amendment) Regulations 2001 SI 2001/1405
The Foot-and-Mouth Disease (Amendment)(Wales)(No.5) Order 2001 SI 2001/1406
The Foot-and-Mouth Disease (Amendment) (England) (No. 5) Order 2001 SI 2001/1407
The National Assistance (Sums for Personal Requirements) (Wales) Regulations 2001 SI 2001/1408
The National Assistance (Assessment of Resources) (Amendment 2) (Wales) Regulations 2001 SI 2001/1409
The Countryside and Rights of Way Act 2000 (Commencement 2) (Wales) Order 2001 SI 2001/1410
The Local Government Act 2000 (Commencement) (No. 2) (Wales) Order 2001 SI 2001/1411
The Patents (Amendment) Rules 2001 SI 2001/1412
The Financial Services and Markets Act 2000 (Service of Notices) Regulations 2001 SI 2001/1420
The Financial Services Act 1986 (Extension of Scope of Act and Meaning of Collective Investment Scheme) Order 2001 SI 2001/1421
The Stop Now Orders (E.C. Directive) Regulations 2001 SI 2001/1422
National Health Service (Optical Charges and Payments) and (General Ophthalmic Services) (Amendment) (No.2) (Wales) Regulations 2001 SI 2001/1423
The General Teaching Council for Wales (Disciplinary Functions) Regulations 2001 SI 2001/1424
The Inner London Court Staff Pensions (Amendment) Order 2001 SI 2001/1425
The Transportable Pressure Vessels Regulations 2001 SI 2001/1426
The Road Traffic (Permitted Parking Area and Special Parking Area) (Borough of Southend-on-Sea) Order 2001 SI 2001/1427
The National Health Service (Pension Scheme and Additional Voluntary Contributions) (Pension Sharing) Amendment Regulations 2001 SI 2001/1428
The Education (School Day and School Year) (England) (Amendment) Regulations 2001 SI 2001/1429
The Jobseeker's Allowance (Amendment) Regulations 2001 SI 2001/1434
The Greenwich Healthcare National Health Service Trust Change of Name and (Establishment) Amendment Order 2001 SI 2001/1435
The Immigration (Restrictions on Employment) (Code of Practice) Order 2001 SI 2001/1436
The Criminal Defence Service (General) (No. 2) Regulations 2001 SI 2001/1437
The Ancient Monuments (Applications for Scheduled Monument Consent) (Welsh Forms and Particulars) Regulations 2001 SI 2001/1438
The Valuation Tribunals (Amendment) (Wales) Regulations 2001 SI 2001/1439
The Coffee Extracts and Chicory Extracts (Wales) Regulations 2001 SI 2001/1440
The District of Cannock Chase (Electoral Changes) Order 2001 SI 2001/1442
The Borough of East Staffordshire (Electoral Changes) Order 2001 SI 2001/1443
The District of Lichfield (Electoral Changes) Order 2001 SI 2001/1444
The Borough of Newcastle-under-Lyme (Electoral Changes) Order 2001 SI 2001/1445
The District of South Staffordshire (Electoral Changes) Order 2001 SI 2001/1446
The Borough of Stafford (Electoral Changes) Order 2001 SI 2001/1447
The District of Staffordshire Moorlands (Electoral Changes) Order 2001 SI 2001/1448
The City of Stoke-on-Trent (Electoral Changes) Order 2001 SI 2001/1449
The Borough of Tamworth (Electoral Changes) Order 2001 SI 2001/1450
The Channel Tunnel Rail Link (Stratford Station and Subsidiary Works) Order 2001 SI 2001/1451
The Civil Aviation Act 1982 (Overseas Territories) Order 2001 SI 2001/1452
The European Convention on Extradition (Fiscal Offences) Order 2001 SI 2001/1453
The Local Authorities (Armorial Bearings) Order 2001 SI 2001/1454
The Education (Inspectors of Education and Training in Wales) Order 2001 SI 2001/1455
The Scotland Act 1998 (Modification of Schedule 5) Order 2001 SI 2001/1456
The Employment Tribunals (Constitution and Rules of Procedure) (Amendment) Regulations 2001 SI 2001/1459
The Employment Tribunals (Constitution and Rules of Procedure) (Scotland) (Amendment) Regulations 2001 SI 2001/1460
The Employment Relations Act 1999 (Commencement 8) (Amendment) Order 2001 SI 2001/1461
The Local Government Act 2000 (Commencement) (No. 2) (Wales) Order 2001 SI 2001/1471
The Employment Appeal Tribunal (Amendment) Rules 2001 (Amendment) Rules 2001 SI 2001/1476
The A15 Trunk Road (North of the M180 Motorway Junction 5 including the Link Road to the A63 Trunk Road) (Detrunking) Order 2001 SI 2001/1477
The Waste (Foot-and-Mouth Disease) (England) Regulations 2001 SI 2001/1478
The Local Government Pension Scheme (Amendment) Regulations 2001 SI 2001/1481
The Local Authorities (Conduct of Referendums) (England) (Consequential Amendment) Order 2001 SI 2001/1494
The Thurrock and Basildon College (Incorporation) Order 2001 SI 2001/1497
The Transport Act 2000 (Commencement 6) Order 2001 SI 2001/1498
The Foot-and-Mouth Disease (Export of Vehicles) (Disinfection of Tyres) (Amendment) (No. 3) Regulations 2001 SI 2001/1499
The Import and Export Restrictions (Foot-and-Mouth Disease) (Wales) (No.5) Regulations 2001 SI 2001/1500

1501-1600
The Housing (Right to Acquire) (Discount) Order 2001 SI 2001/1501
The Import and Export Restrictions (Foot-And-Mouth Disease) (No. 6) Regulations 2001 SI 2001/1502
The Prescribed Waste (Wales) Regulations 2001 SI 2001/1506
The Thurrock and Basildon College (Government) Regulations 2001 ( SI 2001/1507
The Foot-and-Mouth Disease (Marking of Meat and Meat Products) (Wales) Regulations 2001 SI 2001/1508
The Foot-and-Mouth Disease (Amendment)(Wales)(No.6) Order 2001 SI 2001/1509
The Foot-and-Mouth Disease (Marking of Meat and Meat Products) Regulations 2001 SI 2001/1512
The Artificial Insemination of Cattle (Emergency Licences) (England) Regulations 2001 SI 2001/1513
The Foot-and-Mouth Disease (Amendment) (England) (No. 6) Order 2001 SI 2001/1514
The Rendering (Fluid Treatment) (England) Order 2001 SI 2001/1515
The A361 Trunk Road (Southam Road) (Detrunking) Order 2001 SI 2001/1516
The Local Authorities (Executive Arrangements) (Modification of Enactments and Further Provisions) (England) Order 2001 SI 2001/1517
The A423 Trunk Road (Ryton-on-Dunsmore Roundabout to the A361 Southam Road/A422 Hennef Way Roundabout) (Detrunking) Order 2001 SI 2001/1518
The Armed Forces Act 1996 (Commencement 4) Order 2001 SI 2001/1519
The Royal Marines Terms of Service (Amendment) Regulations 2001 SI 2001/1520
The Royal Navy Terms of Service (Ratings) (Amendment) Regulations 2001 SI 2001/1521
The Income Tax (Sub-contractors in the Construction Industry) (Amendment) Regulations 2001 SI 2001/1531
The Rowley Regis College (Dissolution) Order 2001 SI 2001/1532
The St Austell College (Dissolution) Order 2001 SI 2001/1533
The Financial Services and Markets Act 2000 (Transitional Provisions and Savings) (Rules) Order 2001 SI 2001/1534
The Hillingdon Primary Care Trust (Establishment) Amendment Order 2001 SI 2001/1535
The Care Standards Act 2000 (Commencement 6) (England) Order 2001 SI 2001/1536
The South Tees Acute Hospitals National Health Service Trust Change of Name and (Establishment) Amendment Order 2001 SI 2001/1537
The Lowestoft Primary Care Trust (Establishment) Amendment Order 2001 SI 2001/1538
The Artificial Insemination of Cattle (Emergency Licences) (Wales) Regulations 2001  SI 2001/1539
The National Health Service (Payments by Local Authorities to Health Authorities) (Prescribed Functions) (Wales) Regulations 2001 SI 2001/1543
The Channel Tunnel (International Arrangements) (Amendment 3) Order 2001 SI 2001/1544
The A45 Trunk Road (Packington Crossroads Junction Improvement Slip Roads) Order 2001 SI 2001/1545
The Kingston upon Hull City Council (Millennium Bridge) Scheme 2000 Confirmation Instrument 2001 SI 2001/1546
The Motor Cycles Etc. (EC Type Approval) (Amendment) (No. 2) Regulations 2001 SI 2001/1547
The Gelatine (Intra-Community Trade) (England) Regulations 2001 SI 2001/1553
The Superannuation (Admission to Schedule 1 to the Superannuation Act 1972) Order 2001 SI 2001/1587

1601-1700
The Housing Benefit and Council Tax Benefit (Decisions and Appeals and Discretionary Financial Assistance) (Consequential Amendments and Revocations) Regulations 2001 SI 2001/1605
The Southern Derbyshire Mental Health National Health Service Trust Change of Name and (Establishment) Amendment Order 2001 SI 2001/1606
The Air Navigation (Restriction of Flying) (Nuclear Installations) Regulations 2001 SI 2001/1607
The Community Health Services, Southern Derbyshire National Health Service Trust (Dissolution) Order 2001 SI 2001/1612
The Northern Ireland Arms Decommissioning Act 1997 (Amnesty Period) Order 2001 SI 2001/1622
The Pollution Prevention and Control (Foot-and-Mouth Disease) (Air Curtain Incinerators) (England and Wales) Regulations 2001 SI 2001/1623
The Southampton East Healthcare Primary Care Trust Change of Name and (Establishment) Amendment Order 2001 SI 2001/1624
The North Mersey Community National Health Service Trust (Establishment) Amendment Order 2001 SI 2001/1625
The Education (Student Loans) (Amendment) (England and Wales) Regulations 2001 SI 2001/1627
The Elections Act 2001 (Supplemental Provisions) Order 2001 SI 2001/1630
The Sea Fishing (Enforcement of Community Quota and Third Country Fishing Measures) Order 2001 SI 2001/1631
The Freedom of Information Act 2000 (Commencement 1) Order 2001 SI 2001/1637
The Merchant Shipping(Miscellaneous Amendments)Regulations 2001 SI 2001/1638
The Merchant Shipping (Oil Pollution Preparedness, Response and Cooperation Convention) (Amendment) Regulations 2001 SI 2001/1639
The Products of Animal Origin (Import and Export) (Amendment) (England) Regulations 2001 SI 2001/1640
The Education (Induction Arrangements for School Teachers) (Amendment 3) (England) Regulations 2001 SI 2001/1642
The BSE Monitoring (England) Regulations 2001 SI 2001/1644
The Medicines (Veterinary Drugs) (General Sale List) Order 2001 SI 2001/1645
The Medicines (Veterinary Drugs) (Prescription Only) Order 2001 SI 2001/1646
The Motor Vehicles (Tests) (Amendment) Regulations 2001 SI 2001/1648
The Public Service Vehicles (Conditions of Fitness, Equipment, Use and Certification) (Amendment) Regulations 2001 SI 2001/1649
The Goods Vehicles (Plating and Testing) (Amendment) Regulations 2001 SI 2001/1650
The Criminal Justice and Court Services Act 2000 (Commencement 6) Order 2001 SI 2001/1651
The Vaccine Damage Payments (Specified Disease) Order 2001 SI 2001/1652
The Access to Justice Act 1999 (Commencement 8) Order 2001 SI 2001/1655
The Children (Allocation of Proceedings) (Amendment 2) Order 2001 SI 2001/1656
The Air Navigation (Restriction of Flying) (Prisons) Regulations 2001 SI 2001/1657
The Parliamentary Elections (Returning Officer's Charges) (Northern Ireland) (Amendment) Order 2001 SI 2001/1659
The Products of Animal Origin (Import and Export) (Amendment) (Wales) Regulations 2001 SI 2001/1660
The Teddington Memorial Hospital and Community National Health Service Trust (Dissolution) Order 2001 SI 2001/1663
The Kingston and District Community National Health Service Trust (Dissolution) Order 2001 SI 2001/1664
The Halton General Hospital and the Warrington Hospital National Health Service Trusts (Dissolution) Order 2001 SI 2001/1665
The Salford Community Health Care National Health Service Trust (Dissolution) Order 2001 SI 2001/1666
The Medicines (Products for Animal Use—Fees) (Amendment) Regulations 2001 SI 2001/1669
The National Health Service (General Dental Services) Amendment (No. 3) Regulations 2001 SI 2001/1677
The National Health Service (Functions of Health Authorities) (General Dental Services Incentive Schemes) Regulations 2001 SI 2001/1678
The Infant Formula and Follow-on Formula (Amendment) (Wales) Regulations 2001 SI 2001/1690
The Processed Cereal-based Foods and Baby Foods for Infants and Young Children (Amendment) (Wales) Regulations 2001 SI 2001/1691
The Representation of the People (England and Wales) (Amendment) Regulations 2001 SI 2001/1700

1701-1800
The Noise Emission in the Environment by Equipment for use Outdoors Regulations 2001 SI 2001/1701
The Veterinary Surgeons (Examination of Commonwealth and Foreign Candidates) Regulations Order of Council 2001 SI 2001/1703
The Animal By-Products (Amendment) (England) Order 2001 SI 2001/1704
The Sex Offenders (Notification Requirements) (Prescribed Police Stations) Regulations 2001 SI 2001/1708
The Agricultural or Forestry Tractors and Tractor Components (Type Approval) (Amendment) Regulations 2001 SI 2001/1710
The Social Security (Breach of Community Order) (Consequential Amendments) Regulations 2001 SI 2001/1711
The Tobacco Products Regulations 2001 SI 2001/1712
The Education (Student Support) Regulations 2001 (Amendment) Regulations 2001 SI 2001/1730
The Education (Mandatory Awards) Regulations 2001 SI 2001/1734
The Animal By-Products (Amendment) (Wales) Order 2001 SI 2001/1735
The Parliamentary Elections (Returning Officers' Charges) Order 2001 SI 2001/1736
The Foot-and-Mouth Disease (Marking of Meat, Minced Meat and Meat Preparations) Regulations 2001 SI 2001/1739
The Foot-and-Mouth Disease (Marking of Meat, Minced Meat and Meat Preparations) (Wales) Regulations 2001  SI 2001/1740
The National Patient Safety Agency Regulations 2001 SI 2001/1742
The National Patient Safety Agency (Establishment and Constitution) Order 2001 SI 2001/1743
The General Social Care Council (Appointments and Procedure) Regulations 2001 SI 2001/1744
The National Blood Authority (Establishment and Constitution) Amendment Order 2001 SI 2001/1745
The National Health Service (General Dental Services) Amendment (No. 4) Regulations 2001 SI 2001/1746
The Rail Vehicle Accessibility (Great Western Trains Company Class 180 Vehicles) Exemption Order 2001 SI 2001/1747
The Scottish Parliament (Elections etc.) (Amendment) (No. 2) Order 2001 SI 2001/1748
The Representation of the People (Scotland) (Amendment) Regulations 2001 SI 2001/1749
The Scottish Parliament (Elections etc.) (Amendment) (No. 3) Order 2001 SI 2001/1750
The Insolvency Act 2000 (Commencement 2) Order 2001 SI 2001/1751
The Dismissal Procedures Agreement Designation (Electrical Contracting Industry) Order 1991 Revocation Order 2001 SI 2001/1752
The Offshore Petroleum Activities (Conservation of Habitats) Regulations 2001 SI 2001/1754
The Government of Wales Act 1998 (Commencement6)Order 2001 SI 2001/1756
The General Insurance Reserves (Tax) Regulations 2001 SI 2001/1757
The Railways (Closure Provisions) (Exemptions) (St. Pancras) Order 2001 SI 2001/1768
The Civil Procedure (Amendment 3) Rules 2001 SI 2001/1769
The Foot-and-Mouth Disease (Marking of Meat, Meat Products, Minced Meat and Meat Preparations) Regulations 2001 SI 2001/1771
The Import and Export Restrictions (Foot-And-Mouth Disease) (No. 7) Regulations 2001 SI 2001/1772
The Home-Grown Cereals Authority (Rate of Levy)Order 2001 SI 2001/1773
The Elections Act 2001 (Supplemental Provisions) (No. 2) Order 2001 SI 2001/1774
The Child Support (Miscellaneous Amendments) Regulations 2001 SI 2001/1775
The Utilities Act 2000 (Commencement 4 and Transitional Provisions) (Amendment) Order 2001 SI 2001/1780
The Utilities Act 2000 (Commencement 5 and Transitional Provisions) Order 2001 SI 2001/1781
The Utilities Act 2000 (Transitional Provisions) Regulations 2001 SI 2001/1782
The Financial Services and Markets Act 2000 (Compensation Scheme: Electing Participants) Regulations 2001 SI 2001/1783
The Education (Nutritional Standards for School Lunches) (Wales)Regulations 2001 SI 2001/1784
The Income Support and Jobseeker's Allowance (Amounts for Persons in Residential Care and Nursing Homes) Regulations 2001 SI 2001/1785
The Housing (Right to Buy) (Priority of Charges) (Wales) Order 2001 SI 2001/1786
The Miscellaneous Food Additives (Amendment) (Wales) Regulations 2001 SI 2001/1787
The National Health Service (General Medical Services) Amendment (No.2) (Wales) Regulations 2001 SI 2001/1788
The Road Traffic (Permitted Parking Area and Special Parking Area) (County of Hertfordshire) (District of Three Rivers) Order 2001 SI 2001/1789

1801-1900
The Import and Export Restrictions (Foot-And-Mouth Disease) (Wales) (No. 6) Regulations 2001 SI 2001/1801
The Foot-and-Mouth Disease (Marking of Meat, Meat Products, Minced Meat and Meat Preparations) (Wales) Regulations 2001 SI 2001/1802
The Highways Noise Payments and Movable Homes (England) (Amendment) Regulations 2001 SI 2001/1803
The Wildlife and Countryside (Isles of Scilly) Order 2001 SI 2001/1805
The Passenger and Goods Vehicles (Recording Equipment) (Approval of Fitters and Workshops) (Fees) (Amendment) Regulations 2001 SI 2001/1810
The International Transport of Goods under Cover of TIR Carnets (Fees) (Amendment) Regulations 2001 SI 2001/1811
The International Carriage of Dangerous Goods by Road (Fees) (Amendment) Regulations 2001 SI 2001/1812
The Retained Organs Commission (Establishment and Constitution) Amendment Order 2001 SI 2001/1813
The Road Traffic Offenders (Additional Offences and Prescribed Devices) Order 2001 SI 2001/1814
The Drug Abstinence Order (Responsible Officer) Order 2001 SI 2001/1815
The Criminal Justice (Specified Class A Drugs) Order 2001 SI 2001/1816
The Social Security Contributions (Share Options) Regulations 2001 SI 2001/1817
The Social Security Contributions (Deferred Payments and Interest) Regulations 2001 SI 2001/1818
The Financial Services and Markets Act 2000 (Regulations Relating to Money Laundering) Regulations 2001 SI 2001/1819
The Financial Services and Markets Act 2000 (Commencement 3) Order 2001 SI 2001/1820
The Financial Services and Markets Act 2000 (Consequential and Transitional Provisions) (Miscellaneous) Order 2001 SI 2001/1821
The Community Drivers' Hours (Foot-and-Mouth Disease) (Temporary Exception) (No. 2) (Amendment) Regulations 2001 SI 2001/1822
The Local Authorities (Goods and Services) (Public Bodies) (England) (No. 3) Order 2001 SI 2001/1823
The Road Vehicles (Construction and Use) (Amendment) (No. 3) Regulations 2001 SI 2001/1825
The Building Societies (Restricted Transactions) Order 2001 SI 2001/1826
Child Minding and Day Care (Disqualification) (England) Regulations 2001 SI 2001/1827
The Day Care and Child Minding (National Standards) (England) Regulations 2001 SI 2001/1828
Child Minding and Day Care (Applications for Registration) (England) Regulations 2001 SI 2001/1829
Child Minding and Day Care (Certificates of Registration) (England) Regulations 2001 SI 2001/1830
The Income Support (General) (Standard Interest Rate Amendment) Regulations 2001 SI 2001/1831
The Medicines (Aristolochia and Mu Tong etc.) (Prohibition) Order 2001 SI 2001/1841
The Sex Offenders (Notice Requirements) (Foreign Travel) Regulations 2001 SI 2001/1846
The Sex Offenders Act 1997 (Northern Ireland) Order 2001 SI 2001/1853
The Road Traffic (Permitted Parking Area and Special Parking Area) (County of Kent) (Borough of Dartford) Order 2001 SI 2001/1855
The Road Traffic (Permitted Parking Area and Special Parking Area) (County of Northamptonshire) (Borough of Northampton) Order 2001 SI 2001/1856
The Financial Services and Markets Act 2000 (Disclosure of Information by Prescribed Persons) Regulations 2001 SI 2001/1857
The Financial Services and Markets Act 2000 (Competition Information) (Specification of Enactment etc.) Order 2001 SI 2001/1858
The Residential Accommodation (Relevant Premises, Ordinary Residence and Exemptions) (Amendment) (England) Regulations 2001 SI 2001/1859
The Foot-and-Mouth Disease (Amendment) (England) (No. 7) Order 2001 SI 2001/1862
The Housing Benefit and Council Tax Benefit (General) Amendment Regulations 2001 SI 2001/1864
The Employment Zones (Amendment) (No.2) Regulations 2001 SI 2001/1865
The Financial Investigations (Northern Ireland) Order 2001 SI 2001/1866
The Liberia (United Nations Sanctions) (Overseas Territories) (No. 2) Order 2001 SI 2001/1867
The Advisory Centre on WTO Law (Immunities and Privileges) Order 2001 SI 2001/1868
The Local Authorities (Armorial Bearings) (Wales) Order 2001 SI 2001/1869
The Foot-and-Mouth Disease (Amendment) (Wales) (No.7) Order 2001 SI 2001/1874
The Representation of the People (Northern Ireland) (Amendment) Regulations 2001 SI 2001/1877
The Import and Export Restrictions (Foot-And-Mouth Disease) (No. 6) (Wales) (Amendment) Regulations 2001 SI 2001/1884
Child Minding and Day Care (Registration and Annual Fees) Regulations 2001 SI 2001/1886
The Central Manchester and Manchester Children's University Hospitals National Health Service Trust (Establishment) Order 2001 SI 2001/1887
The Mersey Care National Health Service Trust (Establishment) Order 2001 SI 2001/1888
The North Sefton & West Lancashire Community National Health Service Trust (Establishment) Amendment Order 2001 SI 2001/1889
The Central Manchester Healthcare and the Manchester Children's Hospitals National Health Service Trusts (Dissolution) Order 2001 SI 2001/1895
The Road Traffic (Vehicle Testing) Act 1999 (Commencement 1) Order 2001 SI 2001/1896

1901-2000
The Rotherham Priority Health Services National Health Service Trust (Establishment) Amendment Order 2001 SI 2001/1910
The Offshore Installations (Safety Zones) Order 2001 SI 2001/1914
The Winchester and Eastleigh Healthcare National Health Service Trust (Establishment) Amendment Order 2001 SI 2001/1915
The Southampton Community Health Services National Health Service Trust (Establishment) Amendment Order 2001 SI 2001/1916
The Import and Export Restrictions (Foot-And-Mouth Disease) (No. 7) (Amendment) Regulations 2001 SI 2001/1936
The Daventry and South Northamptonshire Primary Care Trust (Establishment) Amendment Order 2001 SI 2001/1937
The Uttlesford Primary Care Trust (Establishment) Amendment Order 2001 SI 2001/1938
The Ealing, Hammersmith and Fulham Mental Health National Health Service Trust (Dissolution) Order 2001 SI 2001/1975
The Import and Export Restrictions (Foot-and-Mouth Disease) (No. 7) (Amendment) (No. 2) Regulations 2001 SI 2001/1983
The Foot-and-Mouth Disease (Export of Vehicles) (Disinfection of Tyres) (Amendment) (No. 4) Regulations 2001 SI 2001/1984
The Health Act 1999 (Commencement 11) Order 2001 SI 2001/1985
The Import and Export Restrictions (Foot-And-Mouth Disease) (Wales) (No. 7) Regulations 2001 SI 2001/1986
The Education (Extension of Careers Education) (Wales) Regulations 2001 SI 2001/1987
The A45 (A508 Queen Eleanor Roundabout to the A14) (Trunking) Order 2001 SI 2001/1988
The A508 (M1 Junction 15 To A45 Queen Eleanor Roundabout) (Trunking) Order 2001 SI 2001/1989

2001-2100
The Crab Claws (Prohibition of Landing) (Revocation) (Wales) Order 2001 SI 2001/2018
The Undersized Whiting (Revocation) (Wales) Order 2001 SI 2001/2019
The Chiropractors Act 1994 (Commencement Order 5 and Transitional Provision) Order 2001 SI 2001/2028
The Disability Discrimination Act 1995 (Commencement 9) Order 2001 SI 2001/2030
The Care Standards Act 2000 (Commencement 7 (England) and Transitional, Transitory and Savings Provisions) Order 2001 SI 2001/2041
The A417 Trunk Road (Cirencester Bypass–Hare Bushes Service Area) (Detrunking) Order 2001 SI 2001/2053
The Medicines (Products Other Than Veterinary Drugs) (General Sale List) Amendment Order 2001 SI 2001/2068
The Education (Publication of Draft Proposals and Orders) (Further Education Corporations) (Wales) Regulations 2001 SI 2001/2069
The Housing Grants (Additional Purposes) (Wales) Order 2001 SI 2001/2070
The Housing Renewal Grants (Prescribed Forms and Particulars) (Amendment) (Wales) Regulations 2001 SI 2001/2071
The Relocation Grants (Forms of Application) (Amendment) (Wales) Regulations 2001 SI 2001/2072
The Housing Renewal Grants (Amendment) (Wales) Regulations 2001 SI 2001/2073
The School Standards and Framework Act 1998 (Amendment of Schedule 18) (England) Order 2001 SI 2001/2086

2101-2200
The A6 Trunk Road (Bedford to Luton) (Detrunking) Order 2001 SI 2001/2101
The A6 Trunk Road (South of Kettering to the A45) (Detrunking) Order 2001 SI 2001/2102
The Education (Inspectors of Schools in England) (No.2) Order 2001 SI 2001/2124
The Designs (Convention Countries) (Amendment) Order 2001 SI 2001/2125
The Patents (Convention Countries) (Amendment) Order 2001 SI 2001/2126
The Health and Safety at Work etc. Act 1974 (Application outside Great Britain) Order 2001 SI 2001/2127
The Air Navigation (Overseas Territories) Order 2001 SI 2001/2128
The A43 Trunk Road (M1 Junction 15A to A16 Stamford) (Detrunking) Order 2001 SI 2001/2130
The A428 Trunk Road (Northampton To East Of Bedford) (Detrunking) Order 2001 SI 2001/2131
The A421 (M1 Junction 13 Roundabout, Husborne Crawley, Bedfordshire) (Trunking) Order 2001 SI 2001/2132
The National Health Service (General Dental Services) (Amendment) (Wales) Regulations 2001 SI 2001/2133
The Care Council for Wales (Appointment, Membership and Procedure) Regulations 2001 SI 2001/2136
The A15 Norman Cross to Grimsby Trunk Road (Tillbridge Lane Junction Improvement) Order 2001 SI 2001/2143
The International Criminal Court Act 2001 (Commencement) Order 2001 SI 2001/2161
The Cowes Harbour (Constitution) Revision Order 2001 SI 2001/2183
The Fowey Harbour Revision Order 2001 SI 2001/2184
The Yarmouth (Isle of Wight) Harbour Revision (Constitution) Order 2001 SI 2001/2185
The Carers (Services) and Direct Payments (Amendment) (Wales) Regulations 2001 SI 2001/2186
The Social Security (Contributions) (Amendment 4) Regulations 2001 SI 2001/2187
The Financial Services and Markets Act 2000 (Disclosure of Confidential Information) Regulations 2001 SI 2001/2188
The Children (Leaving Care) (Wales) Regulations 2001 SI 2001/2189
The Care Standards Act 2000 (Commencement3) (Wales) Order 2001 SI 2001/2190
The Children (Leaving Care) Act 2000 (Commencement) (Wales) Order 2001 SI 2001/2191
The Disabled Children (Direct Payments) (Wales) Regulations 2001 SI 2001/2192
The Common Agricultural Policy (Wine) (Wales) Regulations 2001 SI 2001/2193
The Import and Export Restrictions (Foot-And-Mouth Disease) (No. 8) Regulations 2001 SI 2001/2194
The Foot-and-Mouth Disease (Export of Vehicles) (Disinfection of Tyres) (Amendment) (No. 5) Regulations 2001 SI 2001/2195
The Carers and Disabled Children Act 2000 (Commencement 1) (Wales) Order 2001 SI 2001/2196
The Contaminated Land (Wales) Regulations 2001 SI 2001/2197
The Meat (Enhanced Enforcement Powers) (Wales) Regulations 2001 SI 2001/2198

2201-2300
The Local Authorities (Functions and Responsibilities) (England) (Amendment) Regulations 2001 SI 2001/2212
The A249 Trunk Road (Neatscourt Roundabout to Queenborough Improvement) Order 2001 SI 2001/2213
The Education (Special Educational Needs) (England) Regulations 2001 SI 2001/2216
The Special Educational Needs And Disability Act 2001 (Commencement 1) Order 2001 SI 2001/2217
The Special Educational Needs (Provision of Information by Local Education Authorities) (England) Regulations 2001 SI 2001/2218
The Gelatine (Intra-Community Trade) (Wales) Regulations 2001 SI 2001/2219
The Tax Credits (Miscellaneous Amendments 6) Regulations 2001 SI 2001/2220
The Tax Credits (Miscellaneous Amendments 6) (Northern Ireland) Regulations 2001 SI 2001/2221
The Central Rating List (Wales) (Amendment) Regulations 2001 SI 2001/2222
The Criminal Justice and Police Act 2001 (Commencement 1) Order 2001 SI 2001/2223
The Criminal Justice and Court Services Act 2000 (Commencement 7) Order 2001 SI 2001/2232
The Community Order (Electronic Monitoring of Requirements) (Responsible Officer) Order 2001 SI 2001/2233
The Curfew Order and Curfew Requirement (Responsible Officer) Order 2001 SI 2001/2234
The Import and Export Restrictions (Foot-And-Mouth Disease) (Wales) (No. 8) Regulations 2001 SI 2001/2235
The Foot-and-Mouth Disease (Amendment) (Wales) (No. 8) Order 2001 SI 2001/2236
The Local Authorities (Executive and Alternative Arrangements) (Modification of Enactments and Other Provisions) (England) Order 2001 SI 2001/2237
The Foot-and-Mouth Disease (Amendment) (England) (No. 8) Order 2001 SI 2001/2238
The Feeding Stuffs (Sampling and Analysis) (Amendment) (Wales) Regulations 2001 SI 2001/2253
The Police and Criminal Evidence Act 1984 (Codes of Practice) (Modification) Order 2001 SI 2001/2254
The Financial Services and Markets Act 2000 (Transitional Provisions) (Designated Date for The Securities and Futures Authority) Order 2001 SI 2001/2255
The Financial Services and Markets Act 2000 (Rights of Action) Regulations 2001 SI 2001/2256
The Parental Responsibility Agreement (Amendment) Regulations 2001 SI 2001/2262
The Education (School Government) (Wales) (Amendment) Regulations 2001 SI 2001/2263
The Railway Pensions (Designation, Substitution and Miscellaneous Provisions) Order 2001 SI 2001/2264
The Wireless Telegraphy (Licence Charges) (Amendment) Regulations 2001 SI 2001/2265
The Motor Vehicles (Third Party Risks) (Amendment) Regulations 2001 SI 2001/2266
The Stamp Duty Reserve Tax (Tradepoint) (Amendment) Regulations 2001 SI 2001/2267
The Education (Designated Institutions) (No. 2) Order 2001 SI 2001/2268
The Justices' Clerks (Qualifications of Assistants) (Amendment) Rules 2001 SI 2001/2269
The Road Traffic (Permitted Parking Area and Special Parking Area) (City of Brighton & Hove) Order 2001 SI 2001/2272
The Commission for Local Administration in Wales and Local Commissioner in Wales (Functions and Expenses) Regulations 2001 SI 2001/2275
The Conduct of Members (Principles) (Wales) Order 2001 SI 2001/2276
The Local Authorities (Proposals for Executive Arrangements) (Wales) Order 2001 SI 2001/2277
The Code of Conduct (Non-Qualifying Local Government Employees) (Wales) Regulations 2001 SI 2001/2278
The Standards Committees (Grant of Dispensations) (Wales) Regulations 2001 SI 2001/2279
The Code of Conduct (Qualifying Local Government Employees) (Wales) Order 2001 SI 2001/2280
Local Government Investigations (Functions of Monitoring Officers and Standards Committees)(Wales) Regulations 2001 SI 2001/2281
The Standards Committees (Wales) Regulations 2001 SI 2001/2283
The Local Authorities (Alternative Arrangements) (Wales) Regulations 2001 SI 2001/2284
The Road User Charging (Charges and Penalty Charges) (London) Regulations 2001 SI 2001/2285
The Local Commissioner in Wales (Standards Investigations) Order 2001 SI 2001/2286
The Local Authorities (Executive Arrangements) (Discharge of Functions) (Wales) Regulations 2001 SI 2001/2287
The Adjudications by Case Tribunals and Interim Case Tribunals (Wales) Regulations 2001 SI 2001/2288
The Conduct of Members (Model Code of Conduct) (Wales) Order 2001 SI 2001/2289
Local Authorities (Executive Arrangements) (Decisions, Documents and Meetings) (Wales) Regulations 2001 SI 2001/2290
The Local Authorities Executive Arrangements (Functions and Responsibilities) (Wales) Regulations 2001 SI 2001/2291
The Local Authorities (Referendums) (Petitions and Directions) (Wales) Regulations 2001 SI 2001/2292
Local Authorities (Proposals for Alternative Arrangements) (Wales) Regulations 2001 SI 2001/2293
The Sweeteners in Food (Amendment) (England) Regulations 2001 SI 2001/2294
The Social Security Amendment (Volunteers) Regulations 2001 SI 2001/2296
The Education (Grants for Disabled Postgraduate Students) (Amendment) Regulations 2001 SI 2001/2300

2301-2400
The Damages (Personal Injury) Order 2001 SI 2001/2301
The Prescribed Waste (Wales) (Revocation) Regulations 2001 SI 2001/2302
The Trunk Road Charging Schemes (Bridges and Tunnels) (England) Procedure Regulations 2001 SI 2001/2303
The International Criminal Court Act 2001 (Commencement) (Amendment) Order 2001 SI 2001/2304
The Value Added Tax (Conversion of Buildings) Order 2001 SI 2001/2305
The Road User Charging (Enforcement and Adjudication) (London) Regulations 2001 SI 2001/2313
The Air Quality Limit Values Regulations 2001 SI 2001/2315
The Social Security Act 1998 (Commencement 13) Order 2001 SI 2001/2316
The Rent Officers (Housing Benefit Functions) (Amendment) (No.2) Order 2001 SI 2001/2317
The Rent Officers (Housing Benefit Functions) (Scotland) (Amendment) (No. 2) Order 2001 SI 2001/2318
The Social Security Amendment (Students and Income-related Benefits) Regulations 2001 SI 2001/2319
The Financial Services and Markets Act 2000 (Transitional Provisions) (Ombudsman Scheme and Complaints Scheme) Order 2001 SI 2001/2326
The Social Security Amendment (Discretionary Housing Payments) Regulations 2001 SI 2001/2333
The Discretionary Housing Payments (Grants) Order 2001 SI 2001/2340
The Plant Health (England) (Amendment) Order 2001 SI 2001/2342
The Merchant Shipping (Port State Control) (Amendment) Regulations 2001 SI 2001/2349
The Income-related Benefits (Subsidy to Authorities) Amendment Order 2001 SI 2001/2350
The Environment Act 1995 (Commencement and Saving Provision) (Wales) Order 2001 SI 2001/2351
The Care Standards Act 2000 (Commencement 4) (Wales) Order 2001 SI 2001/2354
The Education (Student Support) (Amendment) (No. 2) Regulations 2001 SI 2001/2355
The Potatoes Originating in Egypt (Amendment) (Wales) Regulations 2001 SI 2001/2356
Valuation for Rating (Plant and Machinery) (Wales) (Amendment) Regulations 2001 SI 2001/2357
The Community Drivers' Hours (Foot-and-Mouth Disease) (Temporary Exception) (No. 2) (Amendment 2) Regulations 2001 SI 2001/2358
The National Health Service (Charges for Drugs and Appliances) (Amendment) (Wales) Regulations 2001 SI 2001/2359
The BSE Monitoring (Wales) Regulations 2001 SI 2001/2360
The Financial Services and Markets Act 2000 (Meaning of Policy and Policyholder) Order 2001 SI 2001/2361
The Financial Services and Markets Act 2000 (Commencement 4 and Transitional Provision) Order 2001 SI 2001/2364
The Safety of Sports Grounds (Designation) Order 2001 SI 2001/2372
The Football Spectators (Seating) Order 2001 SI 2001/2373
The Foot-and-Mouth Disease (Prohibition of Vaccination) (Wales) Regulations 2001 SI 2001/2374
The Foot-and-Mouth Disease (Control of Vaccination) (England) Regulations 2001 SI 2001/2375
The Processed Animal Protein (England) Regulations 2001 SI 2001/2376
The Immigration (Designation of Travel Bans) (Amendment) Order 2001 SI 2001/2377
The Broadcasting (Subtitling) Order 2001 SI 2001/2378
The International Criminal Court Act 2001 (Enforcement of Fines, Forfeiture and Reparation Orders) Regulations 2001 SI 2001/2379
The Financial Services and Markets Act 2000 (Collective Investment Schemes Constituted in Other EEA States) Regulations 2001 SI 2001/2383
The Housing Renewal Grants (Amendment 2) (England) Regulations 2001 SI 2001/2384
The Relocation Grants (Form of Application) (Amendment 2) (England) Regulations 2001 SI 2001/2385
The Housing Renewal Grants (Prescribed Form and Particulars) (Amendment 2) (England) Regulations 2001 SI 2001/2386

2401-2500
The Protection of Wrecks (Designation) Order 2001 SI 2001/2403
The North Middlesex Hospital National Health Service Trust (Change of Name) Order 2001 SI 2001/2407
The Social Security (Contributions) (Amendment 5) Regulations 2001 SI 2001/2412
The A5 London to Holyhead Trunk Road (Nutts Lane Junction Improvement) Order 2001 SI 2001/2416
The Legal Aid in Family Proceedings (Remuneration) (Amendment 3) Regulations 2001 SI 2001/2417
The Utilities Contracts (Amendment) Regulations 2001 SI 2001/2418
The Plant Protection Products (Amendment) (No. 2) Regulations 2001 SI 2001/2419
The Pesticides (Maximum Residue Levels in Crops, Food and Feeding Stuffs) (England and Wales) (Amendment) (No. 2) Regulations 2001 SI 2001/2420
The National Health Service (General Dental Services) Amendment (No. 5) Regulations 2001 SI 2001/2421
The Partnerships (Unrestricted Size) 17 Regulations 2001 SI 2001/2422
The NCS Service Authority (Budget Statement) Order 2001 SI 2001/2427
The NCIS Service Authority (Budget Statement) Order 2001 SI 2001/2428
The Borough of Ribble Valley (Electoral Changes) Order 2001 SI 2001/2429
The Borough of Rossendale (Electoral Changes) Order 2001 SI 2001/2430
The Borough of South Ribble (Electoral Changes) Order 2001 SI 2001/2431
The District of West Lancashire (Electoral Changes) Order 2001 SI 2001/2432
The Borough of Wyre (Electoral Changes) Order 2001 SI 2001/2433
The District of Uttlesford (Electoral Changes) Order 2001 SI 2001/2434
The District of Tendring (Electoral Changes) Order 2001 SI 2001/2435
The District of Maldon (Electoral Changes) Order 2001 SI 2001/2436
The District of Harlow (Electoral Changes) Order 2001 SI 2001/2437
The Borough of Colchester (Electoral Changes) Order 2001 SI 2001/2438
The Borough of Chelmsford (Electoral Changes) Order 2001 SI 2001/2439
The Borough of Castle Point (Electoral Changes) Order 2001 SI 2001/2440
The Borough of Brentwood (Electoral Changes) Order 2001 SI 2001/2441
The District of Braintree (Electoral Changes) Order 2001 SI 2001/2442
The District of Basildon (Electoral Changes) Order 2001 SI 2001/2443
The District of Epping Forest (Electoral Changes) Order 2001 SI 2001/2444
The Agricultural Processing and Marketing Grant (Wales) Regulations 2001 SI 2001/2446
The Thurrock College and Basildon College (Dissolution) Order 2001 SI 2001/2447
The Civil Aviation Authority (Amendment) Regulations 2001 SI 2001/2448
The Cider and Perry (Amendment) Regulations 2001 SI 2001/2449
The Education (Special Educational Needs) (England) (Amendment) Regulations 2001 SI 2001/2468
The Borough of Hyndburn (Electoral Changes) Order 2001 SI 2001/2469
The City of Lancaster (Electoral Changes) Order 2001 SI 2001/2470
The Borough of Pendle (Electoral Changes) Order 2001 SI 2001/2471
The Borough of Preston (Electoral Changes) Order 2001 SI 2001/2472
The Borough of Burnley (Electoral Changes) Order 2001 SI 2001/2473
The Borough of Chorley (Electoral Changes) Order 2001 SI 2001/2474
The Borough of Fylde (Electoral Changes) Order 2001 SI 2001/2475
The Financial Services and Markets Tribunal Rules 2001 SI 2001/2476
The Plant Protection Products (Fees) Regulations 2001 SI 2001/2477
The Scotland Act 1998 (Regulation of Care (Scotland) Act 2001) Order 2001 SI 2001/2478
The Auditor General for Wales (Transfer of Functions) (General Teaching Council for Wales) Order 2001 SI 2001/2479
The Police and Criminal Evidence Act 1984 (Tape-recording of Interviews) (Amendment) Order 2001 SI 2001/2480
The Motor Vehicles (Approval) (Fees) Regulations 2001 SI 2001/2486
The Telecommunications (Licence Modifications) (Amendment) Regulations 2001 SI 2001/2495
The General Teaching Council for Wales (Functions) (Amendment) Regulations 2001 SI 2001/2496
The General Teaching Council for Wales (Additional Functions) (Amendment) Order 2001 SI 2001/2497
The Police Act 1997 (Criminal Records) (Registration) (Amendment) Regulations 2001 SI 2001/2498
The Education (School Day and School Year) (Amendment) (Wales) Regulations 2001 SI 2001/2499
The Plant Health (Amendment) (Wales) Order 2001 SI 2001/2500

2501-2600
The Inspection of Education and Training (Wales) Regulations 2001 SI 2001/2501
The Import and Export Restrictions (Foot-and-Mouth Disease) (No. 9) Regulations 2001 SI 2001/2502
The Beef Special Premium Regulations 2001 SI 2001/2503
The Care Standards Act 2000 (Commencement5 and Transitional Provisions) (Wales) Order 2001 SI 2001/2504
The International Criminal Court Act 2001 (Elements of Crimes) Regulations 2001 SI 2001/2505
The National Lottery (Licence Fees) Order 2001 SI 2001/2506
The Financial Services and Markets Act 2000 (Variation of Threshold Conditions) Order 2001 SI 2001/2507
The Financial Services and Markets Act 2000 (Appointed Representatives) (Amendment) Regulations 2001 SI 2001/2508
The Financial Services and Markets Act 2000 (Consultation with Competent Authorities) Regulations 2001 SI 2001/2509
The Financial Services and Markets Act 2000 (Gaming Contracts) Order 2001 SI 2001/2510
The Financial Services and Markets Act 2000 (EEA Passport Rights) Regulations 2001 SI 2001/2511
The Financial Services and Markets Act 2000 (Transitional Provisions) (Reviews of Pensions Business) Order 2001 SI 2001/2512
The Police (Northern Ireland) Order 2001 SI 2001/2513
The Employment Zones (Amendment) (No. 3) Regulations 2001 SI 2001/2521
The Offshore Installations (Safety Zones) (No. 2) Order 2001 SI 2001/2528
The Import and Export Restrictions (Foot-And-Mouth Disease) (Wales) (No. 9) Regulations 2001 SI 2001/2529
The Commission Areas (Sussex) Order 2001 SI 2001/2530
The Seeds (Fees) (Amendment) (Wales) Regulations 2001 SI 2001/2533
The Teacher Training Incentive (Further Education) (Wales) Regulations 2001 SI 2001/2536
The Agricultural Subsidies (Appeals) (Wales) Regulations 2001 SI 2001/2537
The Care Standards Act 2000 (Commencement6) (Wales) Order 2001 SI 2001/2538
The Tax Credits (Miscellaneous Amendments 7) Regulations 2001 SI 2001/2539
The Tax Credits (Miscellaneous Amendments 7) (Northern Ireland) Regulations 2001 SI 2001/2540
The Capital Allowances (Energy-saving Plant and Machinery) Order 2001 SI 2001/2541
The B1525 (Formerly A16) Trunk Road (Market Deeping/Deeping St. James) (Detrunking) Order 2001 SI 2001/2543
The Local Authorities (Elected Mayors) (Elections, Terms of Office and Casual Vacancies) (England) Regulations 2001 SI 2001/2544
The Welsh Language Schemes (Public Bodies) Order 2001 SI 2001/2550
The Batteries and Accumulators (Containing Dangerous Substances) (Amendment) Regulations 2001 SI 2001/2551
The Stockport (Parish) Order 2001 SI 2001/2553
The European Communities (Designation) (No. 2) Order 2001 SI 2001/2555
The Education (Chief Inspector of Schools in England) Order 2001 SI 2001/2556
The Afghanistan (United Nations Sanctions) (Amendment) Order 2001 SI 2001/2557
The Afghanistan (United Nations Sanctions) (Overseas Territories) (Amendment) Order 2001 SI 2001/2558
The International Criminal Court Act 2001 (Reservations and Declarations) Order 2001 SI 2001/2559
The Specialized Agencies of the United Nations (Immunities and Privileges of UNESCO) Order 2001 SI 2001/2560
The Central Council for Education and Training in Social Work (Transfer Scheme) Order 2001 SI 2001/2561
The Afghanistan (United Nations Sanctions) (Channel Islands) (Amendment) Order 2001 SI 2001/2562
The United Nations (International Tribunal) (Former Yugoslavia) (Amendment) Order 2001 SI 2001/2563
The Life Sentences (Northern Ireland) Order 2001 SI 2001/2564
The Life Sentences (Northern Ireland Consequential Amendments) Order 2001 SI 2001/2565
The Afghanistan (United Nations Sanctions) (Isle of Man) (Amendment) Order 2001 SI 2001/2566
The Reciprocal Enforcement of Maintenance Orders (Hague Convention Countries) (Variation) Order 2001 SI 2001/2567
The Secretaries of State for Transport, Local Government and the Regions and for Environment, Food and Rural Affairs Order 2001 SI 2001/2568
The Kent (Coroners' Districts) Order 2001 SI 2001/2570
The Bermuda Constitution (Amendment) Order 2001 SI 2001/2579
The Rating (Former Agricultural Premises and Rural Shops) Act 2001 (Commencement 1) Order 2001 SI 2001/2580
The Foreign Package Holidays (Tour Operators and Travel Agents) Order 2001 SI 2001/2581
The Public Telecommunication System Designation (FirstMark Carrier Services (UK) Limited) Order 2001 SI 2001/2582
The Public Telecommunication System Designation (Nextlink UK Limited) Order 2001 SI 2001/2583
The Public Telecommunication System Designation (GTS Network (Ireland) Ltd) Order 2001 SI 2001/2584
The Non-Domestic Rating (Former Agricultural Premises) (England) Order 2001 SI 2001/2585
The Non-Domestic Rating (Stud Farms) (England) Order 2001 SI 2001/2586
The Financial Services and Markets Act 2000 (Communications by Auditors) Regulations 2001 SI 2001/2587
The Immigration (Leave to Enter) Order 2001 SI 2001/2590
The Seeds (Fees) (Amendment) (England) Regulations 2001 SI 2001/2598
The Northern Ireland Assembly (Elections) Order 2001 SI 2001/2599
The Magistrates' Courts (International Criminal Court) (Forms) Rules 2001 SI 2001/2600

2601-2700
The Foot-and-Mouth Disease (Marking of Meat, Meat Products, Minced Meat and Meat Preparations) (No. 2) Regulations 2001 SI 2001/2601
The Public Telecommunication System Designation (Isle of Wight Cable & Telephone Company Limited) Order 2001 SI 2001/2602
The Public Telecommunication System Designation (Fibreway Limited) Order 2001 SI 2001/2603
The Public Telecommunication System Designation (ntl Group Ltd) Order 2001 SI 2001/2604
The Public Telecommunication System Designation (Energis Local Access Limited) Order 2001 SI 2001/2605
The Telecommunication Meters (Approval Fees) (BABT) (Amendment) Order 2001 SI 2001/2606
The Public Telecommunication System Designation (Williams Communications UK Limited) Order 2001 SI 2001/2607
The Public Telecommunication System Designation (Carrier 1 UK Limited) Order 2001 SI 2001/2608
The Public Telecommunication System Designation (Broadnet UK Limited) Order 2001 SI 2001/2609
The Public Telecommunication System Designation (Universal Access UK Limited) Order 2001 SI 2001/2610
The Public Telecommunication System Designation (Verizon Global Solutions U.K. Limited) Order 2001 SI 2001/2611
The Education (Special Educational Needs) (England) (Amendment 2) Regulations 2001 SI 2001/2612
The Education (Mandatory Awards) (Amendment) Regulations 2001 SI 2001/2613
The Special Educational Needs and Disability Act 2001 (Commencement 1) (Amendment) Order 2001 SI 2001/2614
The National Savings Stock Register (Amendment) Regulations 2001 SI 2001/2616
The Financial Services and Markets Act 2000 (Mutual Societies) Order 2001 SI 2001/2617
The Welfare Reform and Pensions (Persons Abroad: Benefits for Widows and Widowers) (Consequential Amendments) Regulations 2001 SI 2001/2618
The Child Support, Pensions and Social Security Act 2000 (Commencement 10) Order 2001 SI 2001/2619
The Greater London Authority (Miscellaneous Amendments) Order 2001 SI 2001/2620
The Education (Teacher Training Hardship Grants) (England) (No. 2) Regulations 2001 SI 2001/2621
Education (Teacher Training Bursaries) (England) Regulations 2001 SI 2001/2622
The Import and Export Restrictions (Foot-and-Mouth Disease) (No. 9) (Amendment) Regulations 2001 SI 2001/2623
The District of Rochford (Electoral Changes) Order 2001 SI 2001/2624
The County Council of Hampshire (Norris Bridge Gyratory—Norris Bridge, Pyestock) Scheme 2000 Confirmation Instrument 2001 SI 2001/2625
The Health and Safety (Fees) Regulations 2001 SI 2001/2626
The Foot-and-Mouth Disease (Marking of Meat, Meat Products, Minced Meat and Meat Preparations) (Wales) (No. 2) Regulations 2001 SI 2001/2627
The Import and Export Restrictions (Foot-and-Mouth Disease) (Wales) (No.9) (Amendment) Regulations 2001 SI 2001/2628
The National Health Service Trusts (Membership and Procedure) Amendment (England) Regulations 2001 SI 2001/2629
The Health Authorities (Membership and Procedure) Amendment (England) (No. 2) Regulations 2001 SI 2001/2630
The Primary Care Trusts (Membership, Procedure and Administration Arrangements) Amendment (England) Regulations 2001 SI 2001/2631
The Financial Services and Markets Act 2000 (Commencement 5) Order 2001 SI 2001/2632
The Financial Services and Markets Act 2000 (Financial Promotion) (Amendment) Order 2001 SI 2001/2633
The Financial Services and Markets Act 2000 (Insolvency) (Definition of Insurer) Order 2001 SI 2001/2634
The Financial Services and Markets Act 2000 (Law Applicable to Contracts of Insurance) Regulations 2001 SI 2001/2635
The Financial Services and Markets Act 2000 (Transitional Provisions) (Authorised Persons etc.) Order 2001 SI 2001/2636
The Financial Services and Markets Act 2000 (Transitional Provisions) (Controllers) Order 2001 SI 2001/2637
The Financial Services and Markets Act 2000 (Controllers) (Exemption) Order 2001 SI 2001/2638
The Financial Services and Markets Act 2000 (Own-initiative Power) (Overseas Regulators) Regulations 2001 SI 2001/2639
The Foot-and-Mouth Disease (Export of Vehicles) (Disinfection of Tyres) (Amendment) (No. 6) Regulations 2001 SI 2001/2640
The Merchant Shipping (Life-Saving Appliances) (Amendment) Regulations 2001 SI 2001/2642
The Police and Criminal Evidence Act 1984 (Drug Testing of Persons in Police Detention) (Prescribed Persons) Regulations 2001 SI 2001/2645
The Football (Disorder) (Duration of Powers) Order 2001 SI 2001/2646
The Asian Development Bank (Seventh Replenishment of the Asian Development Fund) Order 2001 SI 2001/2648
The Parliamentary Pensions (Amendment) (Pension Sharing) Regulations 2001 SI 2001/2649
The Specified Risk Material (Amendment) (England) Order 2001 SI 2001/2650
The Financial Services and Markets Act 2000 (Transitional Provisions and Savings) (Civil Remedies, Discipline, Criminal Offences etc.) Order 2001 SI 2001/2657
The Financial Services and Markets Act 2000 (Consequential and Transitional Provisions) (Miscellaneous) (No. 2) Order 2001 SI 2001/2659
The Sex Discrimination (Indirect Discrimination and Burden of Proof) Regulations 2001 SI 2001/2660
The A564 Trunk Road (Stoke-Derby Route) (Derby Southern Bypass, Derby Spur and Junctions) (Amendment) (England) Order 2001 SI 2001/2661
The Transport of Animals (Cleansing and Disinfection) (Wales) Order 2001 SI 2001/2662
The School Standards and Framework Act 1998 (Commencement 9 and Supplemental Provisions) Order 2001 SI 2001/2663
The Sub-Post Office Start-Up Capital Subsidy Scheme Order 2001 SI 2001/2664
The Legal Officers (Annual Fees) Order 2001 SI 2001/2665
The Parochial Fees Order 2001 SI 2001/2666
The Ecclesiastical Judges, Legal Officers and Others (Fees) Order 2001 SI 2001/2671
The Specified Risk Material (Amendment) (England) (No. 2) Regulations 2001 SI 2001/2672
The King's Lynn Conservancy Board (Constitution) Harbour Revision Order 2001 SI 2001/2675
The Income Support (General) (Standard Interest Rate Amendment) (No. 2) Regulations 2001 SI 2001/2676
The Change of Category of Maintained Schools (Wales) Regulations 2001 SI 2001/2678
The Sweeteners in Food (Amendment) (Wales) Regulations 2001 SI 2001/2679
The Education (Assisted Places) (Amendment) (Wales) Regulations 2001 SI 2001/2680
The Street Works (Inspection Fees) (Amendment) (Wales) Regulations 2001 SI 2001/2681
The Welfare of Farmed Animals (Wales) Regulations 2001 SI 2001/2682
The Air Quality Limit Values (Wales) Regulations 2001 SI 2001/2683
The Local Government Act 2000 (Commencement 7) Order 2001 SI 2001/2684
The High Court and County Courts Jurisdiction (Amendment 2) Order 2001 SI 2001/2685
The Home-Grown Cereals Authority Levy (Variation) Scheme (Approval) Order 2001 SI 2001/2687
The A428 Trunk Road (Cambourne Development Trunk Road and Slip Roads) Order 2001 SI 2001/2688
The A428 Trunk Road (Cambourne Development Detrunking) Order 2001 SI 2001/2689

2701-2800
The Learning and Skills Act 2000 (Commencement 4) (Wales) Order 2001 SI 2001/2705
The National Health Service (General Dental Services) (Amendment) (No.2) (Wales) Regulations 2001 SI 2001/2706
The Education (Assisted Places) (Incidental Expenses) (Amendment) (Wales) Regulations 2001 SI 2001/2708
The Education (Foundation Body) (Wales) Regulations 2001 SI 2001/2709
The Social Security (Literacy etc. Skills Training Pilot) Regulations 2001 SI 2001/2710
The Magistrates' Courts Committees (Constitution) (Amendment) Regulations 2001 SI 2001/2711
The Greater London Magistrates' Courts Authority (Constitution) (Amendment) Regulations 2001 SI 2001/2712
The Civil Procedure (Modification of Enactments) Order 2001 SI 2001/2717
The Town and Country Planning (General Permitted Development) (Amendment) (England) Order 2001 SI 2001/2718
The Town and Country Planning (Fees for Applications and Deemed Applications) (Amendment) (England) Regulations 2001 SI 2001/2719
The Representation of the People (Form of Canvass) (England and Wales) Regulations 2001 SI 2001/2720
The Personal Portfolio Bonds (Tax) (Amendment) Regulations 2001 SI 2001/2724
Representation of the People (Form of Canvass) (Northern Ireland) Regulations 2001 SI 2001/2725
The Overseas Insurers (Tax Representatives) (Amendment) Regulations 2001 SI 2001/2726
The Regulation of Investigatory Powers Act 2000 (Commencement 2) Order 2001 SI 2001/2727
The Specified Risk Material (Amendment) (Wales) Regulations 2001 SI 2001/2732
The Foot-and-Mouth Disease (Ascertainment of Value) (No. 5) Order 2001 SI 2001/2734
The Foot-and-Mouth Disease (Amendment) (England) (No. 9) Order 2001 SI 2001/2735
The Community Drivers' Hours (Foot-and-Mouth Disease) (Temporary Exception) (No. 2) (Amendment 3) Regulations 2001 SI 2001/2741
Education (Grants) (Music, Ballet and Choir Schools) (England) Regulations 2001 SI 2001/2743
The Education (Assisted Places) (Amendment) (England) Regulations 2001 SI 2001/2744
The Day Care and Child Minding (Inspections) (Prescribed Matters) (England) Regulations 2001 SI 2001/2745
The Day Care and Child Minding (Functions of Local Authorities: Information, Advice and Training) (England) Regulations 2001 SI 2001/2746
The Teacher Training Agency (Additional Functions) (England) (No. 2) Order 2001 SI 2001/2747
The Transport (Scotland) Act 2001 (Conditions attached to PSV Operator's Licence and Competition Test for Exercise of Bus Functions) Order 2001 SI 2001/2748
The Education Maintenance Allowance (Pilot Areas) Regulations 2001 SI 2001/2750
The Agricultural Holdings (Units of Production) (England) Order 2001 SI 2001/2751
The National Minimum Wage Regulations 1999 (Amendment) (No. 2) Regulations 2001 SI 2001/2763
The Foot-and-Mouth Disease (Ascertainment of Value) (Wales) (No. 5) Order 2001 SI 2001/2771
The Prescription Only Medicines (Human Use) Amendment Order 2001 SI 2001/2777
The Unsolicited Goods and Services Act 1971 (Electronic Communications) Order 2001 SI 2001/2778
Motor Vehicles (Driving Licences) (Amendment) (No.4) Regulations 2001 SI 2001/2779
The Processed Animal Protein (Wales) Regulations 2001 SI 2001/2780
The Local Authorities (Members' Allowances) (Amendment) (Wales) Regulations 2001 SI 2001/2781
The Care Standards Act 2000 (Commencement 7) (Wales) Order 2001 SI 2001/2782
The Children's Commissioner for Wales Act 2001 (Commencement) Order 2001 SI 2001/2783
The Children's Commissioner for Wales Regulations 2001 SI 2001/2787
The Transport Act 2000 (Commencement1) (Wales) Order 2001 SI 2001/2788
The A10 Trunk Road (Wadesmill, High Cross and Colliers End Bypass) Supplementary (No. 2) Slip Road Order 2001 SI 2001/2790
The Civil Procedure (Amendment 4) Rules 2001 SI 2001/2792
The Road User Charging And Workplace Parking Levy (Classes Of Motor Vehicles) (England) Regulations 2001 SI 2001/2793
The Education (Assisted Places) (Incidental Expenses) (Amendment) (England) Regulations 2001 SI 2001/2794
The Licensed Conveyancers' Discipline and Appeals Committee (Procedure) Rules Approval Order 2001 SI 2001/2797
The Sussex Downs College (Incorporation) Order 2001 SI 2001/2798
The Sussex Downs College (Government) Regulations 2001 SI 2001/2799
The Education (Mandatory Awards) (Amendment) (No. 2) Regulations 2001 SI 2001/2800

2801-2900
The Right to Time Off for Study or Training Regulations 2001 SI 2001/2801
The Education (Pupil Registration) (Amendment) (England) Regulations 2001 SI 2001/2802
The Health and Social Care Act 2001 (Commencement1) (England) Order 2001 SI 2001/2804
The National Health Service (Dental Charges) Amendment (No. 2) Regulations 2001 SI 2001/2807
The Motor Vehicles (EC Type Approval) (Amendment) Regulations 2001 SI 2001/2809
The Relevant Authorities (Standards Committee) Regulations 2001 SI 2001/2812
The Foot-and-Mouth Disease (Amendment) (Wales) (No. 9) Order 2001 SI 2001/2813
The Foot-and-Mouth Disease (Amendment) (England) (No. 10) Order 2001 SI 2001/2814
The Road Traffic (Permitted Parking Area and Special Parking Area) (County of Cumbria) (Borough of Barrow-in-Furness) Order 2001 SI 2001/2818
The Road Traffic (Permitted Parking Area and Special Parking Area) (Borough of Bournemouth) Order 2001 SI 2001/2819
The Poole Harbour Revision Order 2001 SI 2001/2820
The Local Authorities (Alcohol Consumption in Designated Public Places) Regulations 2001 SI 2001/2831
Patient Information Advisory Group (Establishment) Regulations 2001 SI 2001/2836
Education (School Teacher Appraisal) (England) Regulations 2001 SI 2001/2855
Breaking the Cycle Bridgwater Education Action Zone (Variation) Order 2001 SI 2001/2856
The Education (Grants etc.) (Dance and Drama) (England) Regulations 2001 SI 2001/2857
The North Somerset Education Action Zone (Extension) Order 2001 SI 2001/2858
The Education (Grants) (Royal Ballet School) Regulations 2001 SI 2001/2859
The Hackney Education Action Zone (Variation) Order 2001 SI 2001/2860
The Education (Grants) (Yehudi Menuhin School) Regulations 2001 SI 2001/2861
The Blackburn with Darwen Education Action Zone (Extension and Variation) Order 2001 SI 2001/2862
The Next Step North East Lincolnshire Education Action Zone (Extension and Variation) Order 2001 SI 2001/2863
The Salford and Trafford Education Action Zone (Extension and Variation) Order 2001 SI 2001/2864
The East Middlesbrough Education Action Zone (Extension and Variation) Order 2001 SI 2001/2865
The Local Government Pension Scheme (Her Majesty's Chief Inspector of Schools in England) (Transfers) Regulations 2001 SI 2001/2866
The Herefordshire Education Action Zone (Extension and Variation) Order 2001 SI 2001/2867
The New Addington Education Action Zone (Extension and Variation) Order 2001 SI 2001/2868
The Leicester (South and West) Education Action Zone (Extension and Variation) Order 2001 SI 2001/2869
The Railtrack (Shortlands Junction) Order 2001 SI 2001/2870
The CfBT/Lambeth Education Action Zone (Extension and Variation) Order 2001 SI 2001/2871
The Barnsley Education Action Zone (Extension and Variation) Order 2001 SI 2001/2872
The Newham Education Action Zone (Extension and Variation) Order 2001 SI 2001/2873
The Children (Leaving Care) (England) Regulations 2001 SI 2001/2874
The Newcastle Education Action Zone (Extension) Order 2001 SI 2001/2876
The Learning and Skills Council for England (Supplementary Functions) Order 2001 SI 2001/2877
The Children (Leaving Care) Act 2000 (Commencement 1) (England) Order 2001 SI 2001/2878
The Value Added Tax (Refund of Tax to Museums and Galleries) Order 2001 SI 2001/2879
The Free Zone (Southampton) Designation Order 2001 SI 2001/2880
The Free Zone (Liverpool) Designation Order 2001 SI 2001/2881
The Free Zone (Prestwick Airport) Designation Order 2001 SI 2001/2882
The Road Traffic (Permitted Parking Area and Special Parking Area) (City of Birmingham) Order 2001 SI 2001/2883
The Northern Ireland Act 2000 (Suspension of Devolved Government) Order 2001 SI 2001/2884
The Water Supply (Water Quality) (Amendment) Regulations 2001 SI 2001/2885
The Amalgamation of the Buckingham and River Ouzel Internal Drainage Districts Order 2001 SI 2001/2886
The National Health Service (Charges for Drugs and Appliances) (Electronic Communications) Order 2001 SI 2001/2887
The National Health Service (Pharmaceutical Services) and (Misuse of Drugs) (Electronic Communications) Order 2001 SI 2001/2888
The Prescription Only Medicines (Human Use) (Electronic Communications) Order 2001 SI 2001/2889
The National Health Service (General Medical Services) (Electronic Communications) Order 2001 SI 2001/2890
The Higher Education Funding Council for England (Supplementary Functions) Order 2001 SI 2001/2891
The Education (Student Support) (European Institutions) (Amendment) (No. 2) Regulations 2001 SI 2001/2892
The Education (Student Support) (Dance and Drama) (Amendment) Regulations 2001 SI 2001/2893
The Education (Grant) (Financial Support for Students) Regulations 2001 SI 2001/2894
The Northern Ireland Act 2000 (Restoration of Devolved Government) Order 2001 SI 2001/2895
The Education (Teachers' Qualifications and Health Standards) (England) (Amendment 2) Regulations 2001 SI 2001/2896
The Education (Induction Arrangements for School Teachers) (Consolidation) (England) Regulations 2001 SI 2001/2897
The Shena Simon College, Manchester (Dissolution) Order 2001 SI 2001/2898
The Education (School Teachers' Pay and Conditions) (No. 4) Order 2001 SI 2001/2899

2901-3000
The Air Navigation (Restriction of Flying) (Nuclear Installations) (Revocation) Regulations 2001 SI 2001/2904
The National Assembly for Wales (Elections: Nomination Papers) (Welsh Form) Order 2001 SI 2001/2914
The New Deal (Lone Parents) (Miscellaneous Provisions) Order 2001 SI 2001/2915
The EC Competition Law (Articles 84 and 85)Enforcement Regulations 2001 SI 2001/2916
The Limited Liability Partnerships (Welsh Language Forms) Regulations 2001 SI 2001/2917
The Social Security (Medical Evidence) and Statutory Maternity Pay (Medical Evidence) (Amendment) Regulations 2001 SI 2001/2931
The City of Salford (Castlefield Bridge) Scheme 2000 Confirmation Instrument 2001 SI 2001/2932
The Education (School Performance Targets) (England) (Amendment) (No. 2) Regulations 2001 SI 2001/2944
The Control of Pollution (Oil Storage) (England) Regulations 2001 SI 2001/2954
The Public Offers of Securities (Exemptions) Regulations 2001 SI 2001/2955
The Financial Services and Markets Act 2000 (Official Listing of Securities) Regulations 2001 SI 2001/2956
The Financial Services and Markets Act 2000 (Official Listing of Securities) (Transitional Provisions) Order 2001 SI 2001/2957
The Financial Services and Markets Act 2000 (Offers of Securities) Order 2001 SI 2001/2958
The Community Drivers' Hours (Foot-and-Mouth Disease) (Temporary Exception) (No. 2) (Amendment 4) Regulations 2001 SI 2001/2959
The Tyne Tunnel (Revision of Tolls and Traffic Classification) Order 2001 SI 2001/2960
The Education (School Teachers' Pay and Conditions) (No. 5) Order 2001 SI 2001/2962
The Local Elections (Declaration of Acceptance of Office) (Amendment) (Wales) Order 2001 SI 2001/2963
The Financial Services and Markets Act 2000 (Consequential Amendments) (Pre-Commencement Modifications) Order 2001 SI 2001/2966
The Financial Services and Markets Act 2000 (Transitional Provisions, Repeals and Savings) (Financial Services Compensation Scheme) Order 2001 SI 2001/2967
The Financial Services and Markets Act 2000 (Treatment of Assets of Insurers on Winding Up) Regulations 2001 SI 2001/2968
The Dartford-Thurrock Crossing (Amendment) Regulations 2001 SI 2001/2973
The Radiation (Emergency Preparedness and Public Information) Regulations 2001 SI 2001/2975
The Court of Protection (Amendment) Rules 2001 SI 2001/2977
The Offshore Installations (Safety Zones) (No. 3) Order 2001 SI 2001/2978
The Social Security (Incapacity) (Miscellaneous Amendments) Regulations 2001 SI 2001/2979
The Social Security Amendment (Personal Allowances for Children and Young Persons) Regulations 2001 SI 2001/2980
The Foot-and-Mouth Disease (Amendment) (Wales) (No. 10) Order 2001 SI 2001/2981
The Agricultural Holdings (Units of Production) (Wales) Order 2001 SI 2001/2982
The Agricultural Holdings (Units of Production) (Wales) (No.2) Order 2001 SI 2001/2983
The Swanage Harbour Revision Order 2001 SI 2001/2984
The Foster Placement (Children) and Adoption Agencies Amendment (England) Regulations 2001 SI 2001/2992
The Competition Act 1998 (Section 11 Exemption) Regulations 2001 SI 2001/2993
The Foot-and-Mouth Disease (Amendment) (England) (No.11) Order 2001 SI 2001/2994
The Plant Health (Forestry) (Great Britain) (Amendment) Order 2001 SI 2001/2995
The Community Legal Service (Funding) (Amendment 2) Order 2001 SI 2001/2996
The Community Legal Service (Financial) (Amendment 2) Regulations 2001 SI 2001/2997

3001-3100
The Common Agricultural Policy (Paying Agencies: Competent Authority and Co-ordinating Body) Regulations 2001 SI 2001/3020
The Gaming Duty (Amendment) Regulations 2001 SI 2001/3021
The Excise Duty Points (Duty Suspended Movements of Excise Goods) Regulations 2001 SI 2001/3022
The Social Fund Maternity and Funeral Expenses (General) Amendment Regulations 2001 SI 2001/3023
The Local Authorities (Companies) (Amendment 2) (England) Order 2001 SI 2001/3042
The General Optical Council (Membership) Order of Council 2001 SI 2001/3057
The Road Traffic (Permitted Parking Area and Special Parking Area) (Metropolitan Borough of Oldham) Order 2001 SI 2001/3058
The Road Traffic (Permitted Parking Area and Special Parking Area) (City of Stoke-on-Trent) Order 2001 SI 2001/3059
The Agricultural Holdings (Units of Production) (Wales)(No.3) Order 2001 SI 2001/3064
The National Health Service (Travelling Expenses and Remission of Charges) Amendment (No. 2) Regulations 2001 SI 2001/3065
The National Health Service (Optical Charges and Payments) and (General Ophthalmic Services) Amendment (No. 2) Regulations 2001 SI 2001/3066
The National Assistance (Residential Accommodation) (Disregarding of Resources) (England) Regulations 2001 SI 2001/3067
The National Assistance (Residential Accommodation) (Additional Payments) (England) Regulations 2001 SI 2001/3068
The National Assistance (Residential Accommodation) (Relevant Contributions) (England) Regulations 2001 SI 2001/3069
The Children (Leaving Care) Act 2000 (Commencement 2 and Consequential Provisions) Order 2001 SI 2001/3070
The Education (Fast Track Bursaries and Grants) (England) Regulations 2001 SI 2001/3071
The Value Added Tax Tribunals (Amendment) Rules 2001 SI 2001/3073
The Children (Leaving Care) Social Security Benefits Regulations 2001 SI 2001/3074
The Financial Services and Markets Act 2000 (Transitional Provisions and Savings) (Civil Remedies, Discipline, Criminal Offences etc.) (No. 2) Order 2001 SI 2001/3083
The Financial Services and Markets Act 2000 (Gibraltar) Order 2001 SI 2001/3084
The Tax Credits (Miscellaneous Amendments 8) Regulations 2001 SI 2001/3085
The Tax Credits (Miscellaneous Amendments 8) (Northern Ireland) Regulations 2001 SI 2001/3086
The Federal Republic of Yugoslavia (Freezing of Funds) (Amendment) Regulations 2001 SI 2001/3087
The General Betting Duty Regulations 2001 SI 2001/3088
The Finance Act 2001 (Commencement) Order 2001 SI 2001/3089

3101-3200
The Organic Farming (England Rural Development Programme) (Amendment) Regulations 2001 SI 2001/3139
The Foot-and-Mouth Disease (Amendment) (England) (No. 12) Order 2001 SI 2001/3140
The Environmental Protection (Controls on Injurious Substances) (Amendment) Regulations 2001 SI 2001/3141
The Energy Information and Energy Efficiency (Miscellaneous Amendments) Regulations 2001 SI 2001/3142
The Foot-and-Mouth Disease (Amendment) (Wales) (No. 11) Order 2001 SI 2001/3145
The Special Waste (Amendment) (England and Wales) Regulations 2001 SI 2001/3148
The Criminal Justice and Police Act 2001 (Commencement 2) Order 2001 SI 2001/3150
The Lewes Tertiary College (Dissolution) Order 2001 SI 2001/3153
Eastbourne College of Arts and Technology (Dissolution) Order 2001 SI 2001/3154
The Housing Act 1996 (Commencement 13) Order 2001 SI 2001/3164
The Export of Goods (Control) (Amendment 2) Order 2001 SI 2001/3166
The Health and Social Care Act 2001 (Commencement 2) (England) Order 2001 SI 2001/3167
The Waste (Foot-and-Mouth Disease) (England) (Amendment) Regulations 2001 SI 2001/3189
The Wireless Telegraphy (Broadband Fixed Wireless Access Licences) Regulations 2001 SI 2001/3193
The Potatoes Originating in Germany (Notification) (England) Order 2001 SI 2001/3194
The Environmentally Sensitive Areas (Stage II) Designation (Amendment) Order 2001 SI 2001/3195
The Environmentally Sensitive Areas (Stage III) Designation (Amendment) Order 2001 SI 2001/3196
The Environmentally Sensitive Areas (Stage IV) Designation (Amendment) Order 2001 SI 2001/3197
The Common Agricultural Policy (Protection of Community Arrangements) (Amendment) Regulations 2001 SI 2001/3198

3201-3300
The Education (Funding for Teacher Training) Designation Order 2001 SI 2001/3202
The Southampton Community Health Services National Health Service Trust (Establishment) Amendment (No.2) Order 2001 SI 2001/3203
The A556 Trunk Road (Plumley Moor Road Junction Improvement) (Detrunking) Order 2001 SI 2001/3206
The Pensions Appeal Tribunals (Scotland) (Amendment) Rules 2001 SI 2001/3207
The Road Vehicles (Construction and Use) (Amendment) (No. 4) Regulations 2001 SI 2001/3208
The Merchant Shipping (Domestic Passenger Ships) (Safety Management Code) Regulations 2001 SI 2001/3209
The Social Security (Jobcentre Plus Interviews) Regulations 2001 SI 2001/3210
The Environment Act 1995 (Commencement 20 and Saving Provision) (Wales) Order 2001 SI 2001/3211
The Brooke House Sixth Form College (Incorporation) Order 2001 SI 2001/3212
The Brooke House Sixth Form College (Government) Regulations 2001 SI 2001/3213
The Data Protection (Notification and Notification Fees) (Amendment) Regulations 2001 SI 2001/3214
The Vehicles (Crime) Act 2001 (Commencement 1) Order 2001 SI 2001/3215
The Housing (Right to Buy) (Priority of Charges) (England) (No. 2) Order 2001 SI 2001/3219
The Data Protection (Subject Access) (Fees and Miscellaneous Provisions) (Amendment) Regulations 2001 SI 2001/3223
The Northern Ireland Act 2000 (Suspension of Devolved Government) (No.2) Order 2001 SI 2001/3230
The Northern Ireland Act 2000 (Restoration of Devolved Government) (No.2) Order 2001 SI 2001/3231
The Carriers' Liability (Clandestine Entrants) (Application to Rail Freight) (Amendment) Regulations 2001 SI 2001/3232
The Carriers' Liability (Clandestine Entrants) (Code of Practice for Freight Shuttle Wagons) Order 2001 SI 2001/3233
The Armed Forces Act 2001 (Commencement1) Order 2001 SI 2001/3234
The Education (School Teachers' Pay and Conditions) (No. 6) Order 2001 SI 2001/3243
The Accounts and Audit (Amendment) (England) Regulations 2001 SI 2001/3244
The Bracknell Forest Primary Care Trust (Establishment) Order 2001 SI 2001/3245
The Windsor, Ascot and Maidenhead Primary Care Trust (Establishment) Order 2001 SI 2001/3246
The Social Security Fraud Act 2001 (Commencement 1) Order 2001 SI 2001/3251
The Social Security (Notification of Change of Circumstances) Regulations 2001 SI 2001/3252
The Disability Discrimination (Providers of Services) (Adjustment of Premises) Regulations 2001 SI 2001/3253
The Working Time (Amendment) Regulations 2001 SI 2001/3256
The Housing (Right to Acquire) (Electronic Communications) (England) Order 2001 SI 2001/3257
The Southern Norfolk Primary Care Trust (Establishment) Order 2001 SI 2001/3258
The Community Drivers' Hours (Foot-and-Mouth Disease) (Temporary Exception) (No. 2) (Amendment 5) Regulations 2001 SI 2001/3260
The Electricity (Unmetered Supply) Regulations 2001 SI 2001/3263
The Utilities Act 2000 (Transitional Provisions) (No. 2) Regulations 2001 SI 2001/3264
The Electricity (Standards of Performance) Regulations 2001 SI 2001/3265
The Utilities Act 2000 (Commencement 6 and Transitional Provisions ) Order 2001 SI 2001/3266
The Gas (Connection Charges) Regulations 2001 SI 2001/3267
The Electricity from Non-Fossil Fuel Sources Saving Arrangements (Amendment) Order 2001 SI 2001/3268
The Electricity from Non-Fossil Fuel Sources (Scotland) Saving Arrangements Order 2001 SI 2001/3269
The Electricity (Class Exemptions from the Requirement for a Licence) Order 2001 SI 2001/3270
The Import and Export Restrictions (Foot-and-Mouth Disease) (Wales) (No. 9) (Amendment) (No. 2) Regulations 2001 SI 2001/3283
The Import and Export Restrictions (Foot-and-Mouth Disease) (No. 9) (Amendment) (No. 2) Regulations 2001 SI 2001/3284
The Foot-and-Mouth Disease (Export of Vehicles) (Disinfection of Tyres) (Amendment) (No. 7) Regulations 2001 SI 2001/3285
The Fossil Fuel Levy (Amendment) (No. 2) Regulations 2001 SI 2001/3286
The Railway Safety (Miscellaneous Amendments) Regulations 2001 SI 2001/3291
The Police (Amendment) Regulations 2001 SI 2001/3293
The Health and Social Care Act 2001 (Commencement 3) (England) Order 2001 SI 2001/3294
The Chiltern and South Bucks Primary Care Trust (Establishment) Order 2001 SI 2001/3295
The Wycombe Primary Care Trust (Establishment) Order 2001 SI 2001/3296
The Rushmoor and Hart Primary Care Trust (Establishment) Order 2001 SI 2001/3297
The Excise Duty (Payments in Case of Error or Delay) Regulations 2001 SI 2001/3299
The Finance Act 2001 (Commencement 2 and Saving Provision) Order 2001 SI 2001/3300

3301-3400
The Access to the Countryside (Maps in Draft Form) (England) Regulations 2001 SI 2001/3301
The Energy Efficiency (Ballasts for Fluorescent Lighting) Regulations 2001 SI 2001/3316
Quality Partnership Schemes (Existing Facilities) Regulations 2001 SI 2001/3317
The National Health Service (Travelling Expenses and Remission of Charges) (Amendment) (No.2) (Wales) Regulations 2001 SI 2001/3322
The National Health Service (Optical Charges and Payments) and (General Ophthalmic Services) (Amendment) (No.3) (Wales) Regulations 2001 SI 2001/3323
The Motor Vehicles (Tests) (Amendment) (No. 2) Regulations 2001 SI 2001/3330
The Care Standards Act 2000 (Commencement 8) (England) Order 2001 SI 2001/3331
The Building (Amendment) Regulations 2001 SI 2001/3335
The Building (Approved Inspectors etc.) (Amendment) Regulations 2001 SI 2001/3336
The Air Passenger Duty and Other Indirect Taxes (Interest Rate) (Amendment) Regulations 2001 SI 2001/3337
The Financial Services and Markets Act 2000 (Controllers) (Exemption) (No. 2) Order 2001 SI 2001/3338
The Food Industry Development (Amendment) (England) Scheme 2001 SI 2001/3339
The Merchant Shipping (Fees) (Amendment) Regulations 2001 SI 2001/3340
The Criminal Defence Service (Funding) (Amendment 3) Order 2001 SI 2001/3341
The Transport Act 2000 (Commencement 7) Order 2001 SI 2001/3342
The Motor Vehicles (Access to Driver Licensing Records) Regulations 2001 SI 2001/3343
The Curfew Order and Curfew Requirement (Responsible Officer) (Amendment) Order 2001 SI 2001/3344
The Curfew Condition (Responsible Officer) (Amendment) Order 2001 SI 2001/3345
The Community Order (Electronic Monitoring of Requirements) (Responsible Officer) (Amendment) Order 2001 SI 2001/3346
The Local Authorities (Goods and Services) (Public Bodies) (England) (No. 4) Order 2001 SI 2001/3347
The Railway Administration Order Rules 2001 SI 2001/3352
The Gas (Applications for Licences and Extensions and Restrictions of Licences) Regulations 2001 SI 2001/3353
The Electricity (Applications for Licences and Extensions and Restrictions of Licences) Regulations 2001 SI 2001/3354
The Borough of Darlington (Electoral Changes) Order 2001 SI 2001/3357
The District of East Riding (Electoral Changes) Order 2001 SI 2001/3358
The Borough of North Lincolnshire (Electoral Changes) Order 2001 SI 2001/3359
The City of Kingston upon Hull (Electoral Changes) Order 2001 SI 2001/3360
The Borough of North East Lincolnshire (Electoral Changes) Order 2001 SI 2001/3361
The City of York (Electoral Changes) Order 2001 SI 2001/3362
The Terrorism (United Nations Measures) (Channel Islands) Order 2001 SI 2001/3363
The Terrorism (United Nations Measures) (Isle of Man) Order 2001 SI 2001/3364
The Terrorism (United Nations Measures) Order 2001 SI 2001/3365
The Terrorism (United Nations Measures) (Overseas Territories) Order 2001 SI 2001/3366
The Civil Aviation Act 1982 (Overseas Territories) (No. 2) Order 2001 SI 2001/3367
The Social Fund Cold Weather Payments (General) Amendment Regulations 2001 SI 2001/3368
The Financial Services and Markets Act 2000 (Interim Permissions) Order 2001 SI 2001/3374
The Social Fund Winter Fuel Payment (Amendment) Regulations 2001 SI 2001/3375
The Local Authorities (Standing Orders) (England) Regulations 2001 SI 2001/3384
The Criminal Justice and Court Services Act 2000 (Commencement 8) Order 2001 SI 2001/3385
The National Health Service (General Medical Services) Amendment (No.3) Regulations 2001 SI 2001/3386
The Feeding Stuffs and the Feeding Stuffs (Enforcement) (Amendment) (England) Regulations 2001 SI 2001/3389
The Fishing Vessels (Decommissioning) Scheme 2001 SI 2001/3390
The Road Traffic (Permitted Parking Area and Special Parking Area) (District of Herefordshire) Order 2001 SI 2001/3397
The Poultry Meat, Farmed Game Bird Meat and Rabbit Meat (Hygiene and Inspection) (Amendment) (England) Regulations 2001 SI 2001/3399

3401-3500
The Local Government Pension Scheme (Amendment 2) Regulations 2001 SI 2001/3401
The Northern Ireland (Sentences) Act 1998 (Specified Organisations) Order 2001 SI 2001/3411
The Mid-Norfolk Railway Order 2001 SI 2001/3413
The Electricity Act 1989 (Commencement 3) Order 2001 SI 2001/3419
The Electricity Council (Dissolution) Order 2001 SI 2001/3420
The Central Electricity Generating Board (Dissolution) Order 2001 SI 2001/3421
The Land Registration (District Registries) Order 2001 SI 2001/3424
The Legal Aid in Criminal and Care Proceedings (Costs) (Amendment 2) Regulations 2001 SI 2001/3425
The Rail Vehicle Accessibility (North Western Trains Class 175/0 and Class 175/1 Vehicles) Exemption Order 2001 SI 2001/3434
The Education (School Teachers' Pay and Conditions) (No. 7) Order 2001 SI 2001/3435
The Financial Services and Markets Act 2000 (Commencement 6) Order 2001 SI 2001/3436
The Financial Services and Markets Act 2000 (Disclosure of Confidential Information) (Amendment) Regulations 2001 SI 2001/3437
The Litigants in Person (Costs and Expenses) (Magistrates' Courts) Order 2001 SI 2001/3438
The Financial Services and Markets Act 2000 (Official Listing of Securities) (Amendment) Regulations 2001 SI 2001/3439
The National Assistance (Residential Accommodation) (Additional Payments and Assessment of Resources) (Amendment) (England) Regulations 2001 SI 2001/3441
The Colours in Food (Amendment) (England) Regulations 2001 SI 2001/3442
The Children (Protection from Offenders) (Amendment) (Wales) Regulations 2001 SI 2001/3443
The Merchant Shipping and Fishing Vessels (Safety Signs and Signals) Regulations 2001 SI 2001/3444
The Education (City Academies) Order 2001 SI 2001/3445
The Education (School Performance Information) (England) Regulations 2001 SI 2001/3446
The Import and Export Restrictions (Foot-and-Mouth Disease) (No. 10) Regulations 2001 SI 2001/3451
The Foot-and-Mouth Disease (Export of Vehicles) (Disinfection of Tyres) (No. 2) Regulations 2001 SI 2001/3452
The Value Added Tax (Refund of Tax) Order 2001 SI 2001/3453
The Tax Credits (Miscellaneous Amendments 9) Regulations 2001 SI 2001/3454
The Education (Special Educational Needs) (England) (Consolidation) Regulations 2001 SI 2001/3455
The Tax Credits (Miscellaneous Amendments 9) (Northern Ireland) Regulations 2001 SI 2001/3456
The Race Relations Act 1976 (General Statutory Duty) Order 2001 SI 2001/3457
The Race Relations Act 1976 (Statutory Duties) Order 2001 SI 2001/3458
The Import and Export Restrictions (Foot-And-Mouth Disease) (Wales) (No. 10) Regulations 2001 SI 2001/3459
The Feeding Stuffs and the Feeding Stuffs (Enforcement) (Amendment) (Wales) Regulations 2001 SI 2001/3461
The Public Record Office (Fees) (No. 2) Regulations 2001 SI 2001/3462
The Burnley, Pendle and Rossendale Primary Care Trust (Establishment) Order 2001 SI 2001/3463
The Fylde Primary Care Trust (Establishment) Order 2001 SI 2001/3464
The Social Security Amendment (Capital Disregards) (No. 2) Regulations 2001 SI 2001/3481
The City of Derby (Electoral Changes) Order 2001 SI 2001/3482
The Motor Vehicles (Driving Licences) (Amendment) (No. 5) Regulations 2001 SI 2001/3486
The Wyre Primary Care Trust (Establishment) Order 2001 SI 2001/3487
The Ashton, Leigh and Wigan Primary Care Trust (Establishment) Order 2001 SI 2001/3488
The Hyndburn and Ribble Valley Primary Care Trust (Establishment) Order 2001 SI 2001/3489
The Central Liverpool Primary Care Trust (Establishment) Order 2001 SI 2001/3490
The Preston Primary Care Trust (Establishment) Order 2001 SI 2001/3491
The South Liverpool Primary Care Trust (Establishment) Order 2001 SI 2001/3492
The North Liverpool Primary Care Trust (Establishment) Order 2001 SI 2001/3493
The Drug Abstinence Order (Responsible Officer) (No. 2) Order 2001 SI 2001/3494
The European Communities (Designation) (No. 3) Order 2001 SI 2001/3495
The Education (Inspectors of Schools in England) (No. 3) Order 2001 SI 2001/3496
The British Nationality Act 1981 (Amendment of Schedule 6) Order 2001 SI 2001/3497
The Consular Fees (Amendment) Order 2001 SI 2001/3498
The Landmines Act 1998 (Overseas Territories) Order 2001 SI 2001/3499
The Transfer of Functions (Miscellaneous) Order 2001 SI 2001/3500

3501-3600
The Reciprocal Enforcement of Maintenance Orders (Designation of Reciprocating Countries) Order 2001 SI 2001/3501
The Ministerial and other Salaries Order 2001 SI 2001/3502
The Transfer of Functions (Fishery Harbours) Order 2001 SI 2001/3503
The Scotland Act 1998 (Transfer of Functions to the Scottish Ministers etc.) (No. 2) Order 2001 SI 2001/3504
The Education (Inspectors of Education and Training in Wales) (No. 2) Order 2001 SI 2001/3505
The Transfer of Functions (War Pensions etc.) Order 2001 SI 2001/3506
The Milk Marketing Board (Residuary Functions) (Amendment) Regulations 2001 SI 2001/3507
The Community Drivers' Hours (Foot-and-Mouth Disease) (Temporary Exception) (No. 2)(Amendment 6) Regulations 2001 SI 2001/3508
The Import and Export Restrictions (Foot-and-Mouth Disease) (No.10) (Fees) Regulations 2001 SI 2001/3509
The Seeds (National Lists of Varieties) Regulations 2001 SI 2001/3510
The Import and Export Restrictions (Foot-And-Mouth Disease) (Wales) (No. 10) (Fees) Regulations 2001 SI 2001/3511
The Passenger Car (Fuel Consumption and  Emissions Information) Regulations 2001 SI 2001/3523
The A1 Trunk Road (A645 Slip Roads and A162 Slip Roads) (Detrunking) Order 2001 SI 2001/3524
The Pneumoconiosis etc. (Workers' Compensation) (Payment of Claims) (Amendment) Regulations 2001 SI 2001/3525
The Political Parties, Elections and Referendums Act 2000 (Commencement 2) Order 2001 SI 2001/3526
The Financial Services and Markets Act 2000 (Commencement 7) Order 2001 SI 2001/3538
The Contracting Out of Functions (Tribunal Staff) Order 2001 SI 2001/3539
The Local Government Elections (Wales) Order 2001 SI 2001/3540
The Potatoes Originating in Germany, Notification (Wales) Order 2001 SI 2001/3541
The Financial Services and Markets Act 2000 (Law Applicable to Contracts of Insurance) (Amendment) Regulations 2001 SI 2001/3542
The Financial Services and Markets Act 2000 (Regulated Activities) (Amendment) Order 2001 SI 2001/3544
The Special Waste (Amendment) (Wales) Regulations 2001 SI 2001/3545
The Specified Risk Material (Amendment) (Wales) (No.2) Regulations 2001 SI 2001/3546
The Council Tax and Non-Domestic Rating (Demand Notices) (England) (Amendment) Regulations 2001 SI 2001/3554
The Borough of Swale (Electoral Changes) Order 2001 SI 2001/3555
The District of Thanet (Electoral Changes) Order 2001 SI 2001/3556
The District of Sevenoaks (Electoral Changes) Order 2001 SI 2001/3557
The District of Shepway (Electoral Changes) Order 2001 SI 2001/3558
The Borough of Tunbridge Wells (Electoral Changes) Order 2001 SI 2001/3559
The Borough of Dartford (Electoral Changes) Order 2001 SI 2001/3560
The Rent Officers (Housing Benefit Functions) (Amendment) Order 2001 SI 2001/3561
The Family Health Services Appeal Authority (Change of Name) Order 2001 SI 2001/3562
The Borough of Ashford (Electoral Changes) Order 2001 SI 2001/3563
The City of Canterbury (Electoral Changes) Order 2001 SI 2001/3564
The Road Traffic (Designation of Permitted Parking Area and Special Parking Area) (County of Cumbria) (City of Carlisle) Order 2001 SI 2001/3565
The Potatoes Originating in Egypt (Amendment) (England) Regulations 2001 SI 2001/3574
The Local Authorities (Model Code of Conduct) (England) Order 2001 SI 2001/3575
The Parish Councils (Model Code of Conduct) Order 2001 SI 2001/3576
The National Park and Broads Authorities (Model Code of Conduct) (England) Order 2001 SI 2001/3577
The Police Authorities (Model Code of Conduct) Order 2001 SI 2001/3578
The Financial Services and Markets Act 2000 (Dissolution of the Board of Banking Supervision) (Transitional Provisions) Order 2001 SI 2001/3582
The Import and Export Restrictions (Foot-And-Mouth Disease) (No.11) Regulations 2001 SI 2001/3584
The Pollution Prevention and Control (Designation of Landfill Directive) Order 2001 SI 2001/3585
The Borough of Maidstone (Electoral Changes) Order 2001 SI 2001/3586
The Borough of Gravesham (Electoral Changes)Order 2001 SI 2001/3587
The District of Dover (Electoral Changes) Order 2001 SI 2001/3588
The Import and Export Restrictions (Foot-And-Mouth Disease) (Wales) (No. 11) Regulations 2001 SI 2001/3589
The Animals and Animal Products (Examination for Residues and Maximum Residue Limits) (Amendment) Regulations 2001 SI 2001/3590
The Bankruptcy (Financial Services and Markets Act 2000) (Scotland) Rules 2001 SI 2001/3591
The Financial Services and Markets Act 2000 (Transitional Provisions) (Partly Completed Procedures) Order 2001 SI 2001/3592

3601-3700
The Greater London Authority Act 1999 (Commencement 10) Order 2001 SI 2001/3603
The A596 Trunk Road (Northside Junction, Workington) (Detrunking) Order 2001 SI 2001/3604
The A596 Trunk Road (Northside Junction, Workington) Order 2001 SI 2001/3605
The Goods Vehicles (Authorisation of International Journeys) (Fees) Regulations 2001 SI 2001/3606
The Leeds West Primary Care Trust (Establishment) Order 2001 SI 2001/3609
The Leeds North East Primary Care Trust (Establishment) Order 2001 SI 2001/3610
The A557 Trunk Road (M62 Junction 7 To Queensway) (Detrunking) Order 2001 SI 2001/3611
The Tonbridge and Malling (Electoral Changes) Order 2001 SI 2001/3615
Postal Services Act 2000 (Disclosure of Information) Order 2001 SI 2001/3617
The Local Government Overseas Assistance (London Pensions Fund Authority) Order 2001 SI 2001/3618
The Health and Social Care Act 2001 (Commencement 4) (England) Order 2001 SI 2001/3619
The East Leeds Primary Care Trust (Establishment) Order 2001 SI 2001/3620
The Homerton Hospital National Health Service Trust (Change of Name) Order 2001 SI 2001/3621
The South Leeds Primary Care Trust (Establishment) Order 2001 SI 2001/3622
The Financial Services and Markets Act 2000 (Exemption) (Amendment) Order 2001 SI 2001/3623
The Financial Services and Markets Act 2000 (Disclosure of Confidential Information) (Amendment) (No. 2) Regulations 2001 SI 2001/3624
The Financial Services and Markets Act 2000 (Control of Business Transfers) (Requirements on Applicants) Regulations 2001 SI 2001/3625
The Financial Services and Markets Act 2000 (Control of Transfers of Business Done at Lloyd's) Order 2001 SI 2001/3626
The South Hampshire Rapid Transit Order 2001 SI 2001/3627
The Merchant Shipping (Fees) (Amendment 2) Regulations 2001 SI 2001/3628
The Financial Services and Markets Act 2000 (Consequential Amendments) (Taxes) Order 2001 SI 2001/3629
The Plant Breeders' Rights (Fees) (Amendment) Regulations 2001 SI 2001/3630
Education (City Academies) (Subject Areas) Order 2001 SI 2001/3631
The Financial Services and Markets Tribunal (Legal Assistance) Regulations 2001 SI 2001/3632
The Financial Services and Markets Tribunal (Legal Assistance Scheme—Costs) Regulations 2001 SI 2001/3633
The Bankruptcy (Financial Services and Markets Act 2000) Rules 2001 SI 2001/3634
The Insurers (Winding Up) Rules 2001 SI 2001/3635
The Financial Services and Markets Act 2000 (Transitional Provisions and Savings) (Business Transfers) Order 2001 SI 2001/3639
The Financial Services and Markets Act 2000 (Savings, Modifications and Consequential Provisions) (Rehabilitation of Offenders) (Scotland) Order 2001 SI 2001/3640
The Money Laundering Regulations 2001 SI 2001/3641
The Electricity Act 1989 (Requirement of Consent for Offshore Wind and Water Driven Generating Stations) (England and Wales) Order 2001 SI 2001/3642
The Finance Act 1996, Section 167, (Appointed Day) Order 2001 SI 2001/3643
The Human Rights Act 1998 (Designated Derogation) Order 2001 SI 2001/3644
The Financial Services and Markets Act 2000 (Misleading Statements and Practices) Order 2001 SI 2001/3645
The Financial Services and Markets Act 2000 (Transitional Provisions and Savings) (Information Requirements and Investigations) Order 2001 SI 2001/3646
The Financial Services and Markets Act 2000 (Consequential Amendments and Savings) (Industrial Assurance) Order 2001 SI 2001/3647
The Financial Services and Markets Act 2000 (Confidential Information) (Bank of England) (Consequential Provisions) Order 2001 SI 2001/3648
The Financial Services and Markets Act 2000 (Consequential Amendments and Repeals) Order 2001 SI 2001/3649
The Financial Services and Markets Act 2000 (Miscellaneous Provisions) Order 2001 SI 2001/3650
The Income Support (General) and Jobseeker's Allowance Amendment Regulations 2001 SI 2001/3651
The Beet Seeds (Amendment) (Wales) Regulations 2001 SI 2001/3658
The High Peak and Dales Primary Care Trust (Establishment) Order 2001 SI 2001/3659
The Leeds North West Primary Care Trust (Establishment) Order 2001 SI 2001/3660
The Blackpool Primary Care Trust (Establishment) Order 2001 SI 2001/3661
The Bolton Primary Care Trust (Establishment) Order 2001 SI 2001/3662
The Community Legal Service (Financial) (Amendment 3) Regulations 2001 SI 2001/3663
The Cereal Seeds (Amendment) (Wales) Regulations 2001 SI 2001/3664
The Fodder Plant Seeds (Amendment) (Wales) Regulations 2001 SI 2001/3665
The Seed Potatoes (Amendment) (Wales) Regulations 2001 SI 2001/3666
The Vegetable Seeds (Amendment) (Wales) Regulations 2001 SI 2001/3667
The General Medical Council (Registration (Fees) (Amendment) Regulations) Order of Council 2001 SI 2001/3668
The Oil and Fibre Plant Seeds (Amendment) (Wales) Regulations 2001 SI 2001/3669
The Continental Shelf (Designation of Areas) Order 2001 SI 2001/3670
The European Communities (Definition of Treaties) (European School) Order 2001 SI 2001/3671
The European Communities (Definition of Treaties) (North Atlantic Salmon Conservation Organization) Order 2001 SI 2001/3672
The European Communities (Immunities and Privileges of the North Atlantic Salmon Conservation Organization) Order 2001 SI 2001/3673
The European Communities (Privileges of the European School) Order 2001 SI 2001/3674
The Northern Ireland Act 1998 (Amendment of Enactment) Order 2001 SI 2001/3675
The Northern Ireland Act 1998 (Transfer of Functions) Order 2001 SI 2001/3676
The Friendly Societies Act 1992 (Industrial Assurance) (Channel Islands) Order 2001 SI 2001/3677
The Registered Designs (Isle of Man) Order 2001 SI 2001/3678
The National Assembly for Wales (Transfer of Functions) Order 2001 SI 2001/3679
The Abolition of the Intervention Board for Agricultural Produce (Consequential Provisions)(Wales) Regulations 2001 SI 2001/3680
The Financial Services and Markets Act 2000 (Prescribed Markets and Qualifying Investments) (Amendment) Order 2001 SI 2001/3681
The London Underground (East London Line Extension) (No. 2) Order 2001 SI 2001/3682
The Controlled Drugs (Substances Useful for Manufacture) (Intra-Community Trade) (Amendment) Regulations 2001 SI 2001/3683
The Import and Export Restrictions (Foot-And-Mouth Disease) (No. 12) Regulations 2001 SI 2001/3684
The Intervention Board for Agricultural Produce (Abolition) Regulations 2001 SI 2001/3686
The Social Security Fraud Act 2001 (Commencement 2) Order 2001 SI 2001/3689
The Occupational Pensions (Revaluation) Order 2001 SI 2001/3690
The Firemen's Pension Scheme (Pension Sharing) Order 2001 SI 2001/3691
The Contracting Out (Administrative and Other Court Staff) Order 2001 SI 2001/3698

3701-3800
The National Institutions Measure 1998 (Amendment) Resolution 2001 SI 2001/3701
The Import and Export Restrictions (Foot-And-Mouth Disease) (Wales) (No. 12) Regulations 2001 SI 2001/3705
The Foot-and-Mouth Disease (Amendment) (Wales) (No. 12) Order 2001 SI 2001/3706
The Channel Tunnel (International Arrangements) (Amendment 4) Order 2001 SI 2001/3707
The Education (Schools and Further and Higher Education) (Amendment) (Wales) Regulations 2001 SI 2001/3708
The Farm Waste Grant (Nitrate Vulnerable Zones) (Wales) Scheme 2001 SI 2001/3709
The Learning and Skills Act 2000 (Consequential Amendments) (Schools) (Wales) Regulations 2001 SI 2001/3710
The Parent Governor Representatives and Church Representatives (Wales) Regulations 2001 SI 2001/3711
The Mental Health Act 1983 (Remedial) Order 2001 SI 2001/3712
The Greater London Authority (Miscellaneous Amendments) (No. 2) Order 2001 SI 2001/3719
The Income Support (General) (Standard Interest Rate Amendment) (No. 3) Regulations 2001 SI 2001/3721
The Foot-and-Mouth Disease (Amendment) (England) (No. 13) Order 2001 SI 2001/3722
The Social Security (Contributions) (Amendment 6) Regulations 2001 SI 2001/3728
The Friendly Societies Act 1974 (Seal of the Financial Services Authority) Regulations 2001 SI 2001/3729
The General Medical Council (Professional Performance) (Amendment) Rules Order of Council 2001 SI 2001/3730
The Local Authorities (Approved Investments) (Amendment) (Wales) Regulations 2001 SI 2001/3731
The Pennine Care National Health Service Trust (Establishment) and the Tameside and Glossop Community and Priority Services National Health Service Trust (Dissolution) Order 2001 SI 2001/3733
The Regulation of Investigatory Powers (Technical Advisory Board) Order 2001 SI 2001/3734
The Civil Legal Aid (General) (Amendment2) Regulations 2001 SI 2001/3735
The Criminal Justice and Police Act 2001 (Commencement 3) Order 2001 SI 2001/3736
Education (Teachers' Qualifications and Health Standards) (England) (Amendment) (No. 3) Regulations 2001 SI 2001/3737
The Health and Social Care Act 2001 (Commencement 6) (England) Order 2001 SI 2001/3738
The National Health Service (General Ophthalmic Services) Amendment (No. 2) Regulations 2001 SI 2001/3739
The National Health Service (General Medical Services Supplementary List) Regulations 2001 SI 2001/3740
The National Health Service (General Dental Services) Amendment (No.6) Regulations 2001 SI 2001/3741
The National Health Service (General Medical Services) Amendment (No. 4) Regulations 2001 SI 2001/3742
The Family Health Services Appeal Authority (Primary Care Act) Regulations 2001 SI 2001/3743
The Abolition of the NHS Tribunal (Consequential Provisions) Regulations 2001 SI 2001/3744
The Smoke Control Areas (Authorised Fuels) (England) Regulations 2001 SI 2001/3745
The Variation of Stamp Duties Regulations 2001 SI 2001/3746
The Stamp Duty (Disadvantaged Areas) Regulations 2001 SI 2001/3747
The Finance Act 2001, Section 92(8), (Specified Day) Order 2001 SI 2001/3748
The Sheep and Goats Spongiform Encephalopathy (England and Wales) (Compensation) (Amendment) Order 2001 SI 2001/3749
The Family Health Services Appeal Authority (Procedure) Rules 2001 SI 2001/3750
Medicines (Products for Animal Use—Fees) (Amendment 2) Regulations 2001 SI 2001/3751
The Health and Social Care Act 2001 (Commencement 5) Order 2001 SI 2001/3752
The Value Added Tax (Special Provisions) (Amendment) Order 2001 SI 2001/3753
The Value Added Tax (Cars) (Amendment) Order 2001 SI 2001/3754
The Uncertificated Securities Regulations 2001 SI 2001/3755
The Accounts and Audit (Amendment) (Wales) Regulations 2001 SI 2001/3760
The Plant Health (Amendment) (Wales) (No.2) Order 2001 SI 2001/3761
The Smoke Control Areas (Authorised Fuels)(Wales) Regulations 2001 SI 2001/3762
The M25 Motorway (Junctions 10 to 16) (Variable Speed Limits) Regulations 2001 SI 2001/3763
The Mandatory Travel Concessions (Reimbursement Arrangements) (Wales) Regulations 2001 SI 2001/3764
The Travel Concessions (Extension of Entitlement) (Wales) Order 2001 SI 2001/3765
The Equipment and Protective Systems Intended for Use in Potentially Explosive Atmospheres (Amendment) Regulations 2001 SI 2001/3766
The Social Security Amendment (Residential Care and Nursing Homes) Regulations 2001 SI 2001/3767
The Financial Services and Markets Act 2000 (Scope of Permission Notices) Order 2001 SI 2001/3771
The Income Tax (Indexation) (No. 2) Order 2001 SI 2001/3773
The Environmentally Sensitive Areas (Stage II) Designation (Amendment) (No.2) Order 2001 SI 2001/3774
The Miscellaneous Food Additives (Amendment) (England) (No. 2) Regulations 2001 SI 2001/3775
The Preserved Rights (Transfer of Responsibilities to Local Authorities) Regulations 2001 SI 2001/3776
The Personal Equity Plan (Amendment 2) Regulations 2001 SI 2001/3777
The Individual Savings Account (Amendment 2) Regulations 2001 SI 2001/3778
The Stamp Duty Reserve Tax (UK Depositary Interests in Foreign Securities) (Amendment) Regulations 2001 SI 2001/3779
The Education (School Attendance Targets) (England) (Amendment) Regulations 2001 SI 2001/3785
The National Health Service Trusts (Membership and Procedure) Amendment (No. 2) 2001 (England) Regulations SI 2001/3786
The Primary Care Trusts (Membership, Procedure and Administration Arrangements) Amendment (No. 2) (England) Regulations 2001 SI 2001/3787
The Care Trusts (Applications and Consultation) Regulations 2001 SI 2001/3788
The Greater London Authority Elections (Amendment) Rules 2001 SI 2001/3789
The Offshore Installations (Safety Zones) (No. 4) Order 2001 SI 2001/3790
The Health Service Medicines (Information on the Prices of Specified Generic Medicines) Regulations 2001 SI 2001/3798
The Enterprise Management Incentives (Gross Asset Requirement) Order 2001 SI 2001/3799
The Financial Services and Markets Act 2000 (Financial Promotion) (Amendment 2) Order 2001 SI 2001/3800

3801-3900
The Financial Services and Markets Act 2000 (Consequential Amendments) (No. 2) Order 2001 SI 2001/3801
The Farm Enterprise Grant and Farm Improvement Grant (Wales) Regulations 2001 SI 2001/3806
The Health and Social Care Act 2001 (Commencement 1) (Wales) Order 2001 SI 2001/3807
The Derby College (Incorporation) Order 2001 SI 2001/3808
The Ealing Tertiary College (Dissolution) Order 2001 SI 2001/3809
The Derby College (Government) Regulations 2001 SI 2001/3810
The South Wales Sea Fisheries Committee (Levies) Regulations 2001 SI 2001/3811
The Community Legal Service (Cost Protection) (Amendment 2) Regulations 2001 SI 2001/3812
The A49 Trunk Road in Cheshire (County of Shropshire Border to the Borough of Warrington Border) (Detrunking) Order 2001 SI 2001/3813
The Plant Protection Products (Amendment) (No.3) Regulations 2001 SI 2001/3814
The Education Development Plans (England) Regulations 2001 SI 2001/3815
The Rehabilitation of Offenders Act 1974 (Exceptions) (Amendment) (No. 2) Order 2001 SI 2001/3816
The A54 Trunk Road in Cheshire (A51 Tarvin Roundabout to A54/A556 Junction) (Detrunking) Order 2001 SI 2001/3817
The A51 Trunk Road in Cheshire (A51/A41 Junction to A51/A49 Tarporley Roundabout and A51/A49 Junction (Four Lanes End) to A51/A500 Roundabout) (Detrunking) Order 2001 SI 2001/3818
The A41 Trunk Road in Cheshire (No Man's Heath Bypass) (Detrunking) Order 2001 SI 2001/3819
The A41 Trunk Road in Cheshire (County of Shropshire Border to the A41/A51 Junction) (Detrunking) Order 2001 SI 2001/3820
The Staffordshire Moorlands Primary Care Trust (Establishment) Order 2001 SI 2001/3821
The A49 Trunk Road (County of Cheshire Border and Borough of Warrington Border to the A49/M56 Roundabout at Stretton) (Detrunking) Order 2001 SI 2001/3822
The Dudley South Primary Care Trust (Establishment) Order 2001 SI 2001/3823
The A41 Trunk Road (Birkenhead (Wirral) to M53 Motorway) (Detrunking) Order 2001 SI 2001/3824
The Dudley Beacon and Castle Primary Care Trust (Establishment) Order 2001 SI 2001/3825
The A556 Trunk Road in Cheshire (A556/A54 Junction to M6 Motorway) (Detrunking) Order 2001 SI 2001/3826
The A500 Trunk Road in Cheshire (A500/A51 Roundabout to the A500 Cheerbrook Roundabout) (Detrunking) Order 2001 SI 2001/3827
The Value Added Tax (Amendment) (No. 3) Regulations 2001 SI 2001/3828
The Newcastle-under-Lyme Primary Care Trust (Establishment) Order 2001 SI 2001/3829
The Welfare of Animals (Slaughter or Killing) (Amendment) (England) Regulations 2001 SI 2001/3830
The Meat (Hygiene and Inspection) (Charges) (Amendment) (No.2) (Wales) Regulations 2001 SI 2001/3831
The Trade Marks (Amendment) Rules 2001 SI 2001/3832
The Soundwell College, Bristol (Dissolution) Order 2001 SI 2001/3833
The Pesticides (Maximum Residue Levels in Crops, Food and Feeding Stuffs) (England and Wales) (Amendment) (No. 3) Regulations 2001 SI 2001/3834
The Ealing Primary Care Trust (Establishment) Order 2001 SI 2001/3835
The East Basildon Education Action Zone (Extension and Variation) Order 2001 SI 2001/3836
The Birmingham (Kitts Green and Shard End) Education Action Zone (Extension and Variation) Order 2001 SI 2001/3837
The North Southwark Education Action Zone (Extension and Variation) Order 2001 SI 2001/3838
The Leigh Education Action Zone (Extension and Variation) Order 2001 SI 2001/3839
The Kingston upon Hull (Bransholme Area) Education Action Zone (Extension and Variation) Order 2001 SI 2001/3840
The East Brighton Education Action Zone (Extension and Variation) Order 2001 SI 2001/3841
The Halifax Education Action Zone (Extension and Variation) Order 2001 SI 2001/3842
The North East Sheffield Education Action Zone (Extension and Variation) Order 2001 SI 2001/3843
The Plymouth Education Action Zone (Extension and Variation) Order 2001 SI 2001/3844
The Thetford Education Action Zone (Extension and Variation) Order 2001 SI 2001/3845
The South Tyneside Education Action Zone (Extension and Variation) Order 2001 SI 2001/3846
The Birmingham (Aston and Nechells) Education Action Zone (Extension and Variation) Order 2001 SI 2001/3847
The Nottingham (Bulwell) Education Action Zone (Extension and Variation) Order 2001 SI 2001/3848
The Medicines (Sale or Supply) (Miscellaneous Provisions) Amendment Regulations 2001 SI 2001/3849
The Hounslow Primary Care Trust (Establishment) Order 2001 SI 2001/3850
The Hammersmith and Fulham Primary Care Trust (Establishment) Order 2001 SI 2001/3851
The Care Standards Act 2000 (Commencement 9 (England) and Transitional and Savings Provisions) Order 2001 SI 2001/3852
Fur Farming (Compensation Scheme) (England) Order 2001 SI 2001/3853
Fur Farming (Prohibition) Act 2000 (Commencement) Order 2001 SI 2001/3854
The Taxes (Interest Rate) (Amendment 3) Regulations 2001 SI 2001/3860
The Import and Export Restrictions (Foot-And-Mouth Disease) (No. 13) Regulations 2001 SI 2001/3861
The Import and Export Restrictions (Foot-and-Mouth Disease) (Wales) (No. 13) Regulations 2001 SI 2001/3865
The Public Telecommunication System Designation (Sprintlink UK Limited) Order 2001 SI 2001/3866
The Public Telecommunication System Designation (SSE Telecommunications Limited) Order 2001 SI 2001/3867
The Public Telecommunication System Designation (Midlands Electricity PLC) Order 2001 SI 2001/3868
The Public Telecommunication System Designation (Alpha Telecom Communications Limited) Order 2001 SI 2001/3869
The Public Telecommunication System Designation (Eigernet Limited) Order 2001 SI 2001/3870
The Public Telecommunication System Designation (LETel Limited) Order 2001 SI 2001/3871
The Veterinary Surgeons and Veterinary Practitioners (Registration) (Amendment) Regulations Order of Council 2001 SI 2001/3872
The Double Taxation Relief (Surrender of Relievable Tax Within a Group) (Amendment) Regulations 2001 SI 2001/3873
The Housing (Right to Buy) (Priority of Charges) (England) (No. 3) Order 2001 SI 2001/3874
The District of Forest of Dean (Electoral Changes) Order 2001 SI 2001/3880
The Borough of Tewkesbury (Electoral Changes) Order 2001 SI 2001/3881
The Borough of Cheltenham (Electoral Changes) Order 2001 SI 2001/3882
The District of Stroud (Parishes and Electoral Changes) Order 2001 SI 2001/3883
The City of Gloucester (Electoral Changes) Order 2001 SI 2001/3884
The District of Cotswold (Electoral Changes) Order 2001 SI 2001/3885
The Severn Bridges Tolls Order 2001 SI 2001/3886
The Statistics of Trade (Customs and Excise) (Amendment) Regulations 2001 SI 2001/3887
The Criminal Justice and Police Act 2001 (Consequential Amendments) (Police Ranks) Regulations 2001 SI 2001/3888
The District of Waveney (Electoral Changes) Order 2001 SI 2001/3889
The Borough of Ipswich (Electoral Changes) Order 2001 SI 2001/3890
The District of Mid Suffolk (Electoral Changes) Order 2001 SI 2001/3891
The District of Suffolk Coastal (Electoral Changes)Order 2001 SI 2001/3892
The District of Forest Heath (Electoral Changes) Order 2001 SI 2001/3893
The District of Babergh (Electoral Changes) Order 2001 SI 2001/3894
The Borough of St Edmundsbury (Electoral Changes) Order 2001 SI 2001/3895
The Motor Fuel (Composition and Content) (Amendment) Regulations 2001 SI 2001/3896
The Rural Development Grants (Agriculture and Forestry) (Amendment) Regulations 2001 SI 2001/3897
The Plant Protection Products (Payments) Regulations 2001 SI 2001/3898
The Rural Development Grants (Local Communities) Regulations 2001 SI 2001/3899
The England Rural Development Programme (Project Variations) Regulations 2001 SI 2001/3900

3901-4000
The Education (External Qualifications) (Description of Tests) (Wales) Regulations 2001 SI 2001/3901
The Public Trustee (Notices Affecting Land) (Title on Death) (Amendment) Regulations 2001 SI 2001/3902
The Slaughter Premium (Amendment) Regulations 2001 SI 2001/3906
The Education (Qualifications, Curriculum and Assessment Authority for Wales) (Conferment of Function) Order 2001 SI 2001/3907
The Drivers' Hours (Goods Vehicles) (Milk Collection) (Temporary Exemption) (Revocation) Regulations 2001 SI 2001/3908
The Colours in Food (Amendment)(Wales) Regulations 2001 SI 2001/3909
The Non-Domestic Rating Contributions (Wales) (Amendment) Regulations 2001 SI 2001/3910
The Water Supply (Water Quality) Regulations 2001 SI 2001/3911
The Sea Fishing (Enforcement of Community Satellite Monitoring Measures) Order 2000 Amendment Regulations 2001 SI 2001/3912
The Electricity from Non-Fossil Fuel Sources (Locational Flexibility) Order 2001 SI 2001/3914
The Local Authorities (Referendums) (Petitions and Directions) (England) (Amendment) (No. 3) Regulations 2001 SI 2001/3915
The Non-Domestic Rating (Designation of Rural Areas) (England) Order 2001 SI 2001/3916
The Scotland Act 1998 (Agency Arrangements) (Specification) Order 2001 SI 2001/3917
The High Court of Justiciary (Proceedings in the Netherlands) (United Nations) (Variation) Order 2001 SI 2001/3918
The European Communities (Designation) (No. 4) Order 2001 SI 2001/3919
The United Nations (International Tribunal) (Rwanda) (Amendment) Order 2001 SI 2001/3920
The Organisation for the Prohibition of Chemical Weapons (Immunities and Privileges) Order 2001 SI 2001/3921
The Visiting Forces Act (Application to Bermuda) Order 2001 SI 2001/3922
The Child Abduction and Custody (Parties to Conventions) (Amendment) Order 2001 SI 2001/3923
The Double Taxation Relief (Taxes on Income) (The Hashemite Kingdom of Jordan) Order 2001 SI 2001/3924
The Double Taxation Relief (Taxes on Income) (Lithuania) Order 2001 SI 2001/3925
The Dentists Act 1984 (Amendment) Order 2001 SI 2001/3926
The Terrorism Act 2000 (Enforcement of External Orders) Order 2001 SI 2001/3927
The Civil Jurisdiction and Judgments (Authentic Instruments and Court Settlements) Order 2001 SI 2001/3928
The Civil Jurisdiction and Judgments Order 2001 SI 2001/3929
The Landmines Act 1998 (Jersey) Order 2001 SI 2001/3930
The European Convention on Cinematographic Co-production (Amendment) (No. 2) Order 2001 SI 2001/3931
The Misuse of Drugs Act 1971 (Modification) Order 2001 SI 2001/3932
The Criminal Justice (International Co-operation) Act 1990 (Modification) Order 2001 SI 2001/3933
The Education (Inspectors of Schools in England) (No. 4) Order 2001 SI 2001/3934
The European Communities (Definition of Treaties) (Partnership Agreement between the Members of the African, Caribbean and Pacific Group of States and the European Community and its Member States (The Cotonou Agreement)) Order 2001 SI 2001/3935
The Repatriation of Prisoners Act 1984 (Isle of Man) Order 2001 SI 2001/3936
The Regulatory Reform (Special Occasions Licensing) Order 2001 SI 2001/3937
The Education (Induction Arrangements for School Teachers) (Consolidation) (England) (Amendment) Regulations 2001 SI 2001/3938
The Local Elections (Declaration of Acceptance of Office) Order 2001 SI 2001/3941
The Prescription Only Medicines (Human Use) Amendment (No. 2) Order 2001 SI 2001/3942
The Education (Special Educational Needs Code of Practice) (Appointed Day) (England) Order 2001 SI 2001/3943
The Non-Domestic Rating Contributions (England) (Amendment) Regulations 2001 SI 2001/3944
The Protection of the Euro against Counterfeiting Regulations 2001 SI 2001/3948
The Registered Designs Regulations 2001 SI 2001/3949
The Registered Designs (Amendment) Rules 2001 SI 2001/3950
The Registered Designs (Fees) (Amendment) Rules 2001 SI 2001/3951
The Rail Vehicle Accessibility (Croydon Tramlink Class CR4000 Vehicles) Exemption Order 2001 SI 2001/3952
The Rail Vehicle Accessibility (ScotRail Class 170/4 Vehicles) Exemption Order 2001 SI 2001/3953
The Rail Vehicle Accessibility (Gatwick Express Class 460 Vehicles) Exemption (Amendment) Order 2001 SI 2001/3954
The Rail Vehicle Accessibility (C2C Class 357/0 Vehicles) Exemption Order 2001 SI 2001/3955
The Noise Emission in the Environment by Equipment for use Outdoors (Amendment) Regulations 2001 SI 2001/3958
The Northern Ireland (Date of Next Assembly Poll) Order 2001 SI 2001/3959
The BSE Monitoring (England) (Amendment) Regulations 2001 SI 2001/3960
The Local Authorities (Arrangements for the Discharge of Functions) (England) (Amendment) Regulations 2001 SI 2001/3961
The Local Government Commission for England (Transfer of Functions) Order 2001 SI 2001/3962
The National Health Service (General Dental Services) Amendment (No. 7) Regulations 2001 SI 2001/3963
The Medicines (Pharmacies) (Applications for Registration and Fees) Amendment Regulations 2001 SI 2001/3964
The Care Homes Regulations 2001 SI 2001/3965
The Environmental Impact Assessment (Uncultivated Land and Semi-natural Areas) (England) Regulations 2001 SI 2001/3966
The Children's Homes Regulations 2001 SI 2001/3967
The Private and Voluntary Health Care (England) Regulations 2001 SI 2001/3968
The National Care Standards Commission (Registration) Regulations 2001 SI 2001/3969
The Gaming Machines (Maximum Prizes) Regulations 2001 SI 2001/3970
The Gaming Act (Variation of Monetary Limits) Order 2001 SI 2001/3971
The Return of Cultural Objects (Amendment) (No. 2) Regulations 2001 SI 2001/3972
The Friendly Societies (Provisional Repayments for Exempt Business) (Amendment) Regulations 2001 SI 2001/3973
The Individual Savings Account (Insurance Companies) (Amendment) Regulations 2001 SI 2001/3974
The Friendly Societies (Modification of the Corporation Tax Acts) (Amendment) Regulations 2001 SI 2001/3975
The National Care Standards Commission (Fees and Frequency of Inspections) Regulations 2001 SI 2001/3980
The Goods Vehicles (Enforcement Powers) Regulations 2001 SI 2001/3981
The Special Educational Needs Tribunal (Time Limits) (Wales) Regulations 2001 SI 2001/3982
The Public Lending Right Scheme 1982 (Commencement of Variations) Order 2001 SI 2001/3984
The Preserved Rights (Transfer of Responsibilities to Local Authorities) (Wales) Regulations 2001 SI 2001/3985
The Countryside Stewardship (Amendment) Regulations 2001 SI 2001/3991
The Special Educational Needs and Disability Act 2001 (Commencement 2) (Wales) Order 2001 SI 2001/3992
General Teaching Council for England (Deduction of Fees) Regulations 2001 SI 2001/3993
The Education Standards Fund (England) (Amendment) Regulations 2001 SI 2001/3994
The Smoke Control Areas (Authorised Fuels) (Amendment) (Wales) Regulations 2001 SI 2001/3996
The Misuse of Drugs (Designation) Order 2001 SI 2001/3997
The Misuse of Drugs Regulations 2001 SI 2001/3998
The Tonnage Tax (Training Requirement) (Amendment) Regulations 2001 SI 2001/3999
The National Health Service (General Dental Services) (Amendment) (No.3) (Wales) Regulations 2001 SI 2001/4000

4001-4100
The Countryside Access (Draft Maps) (Wales) Regulations 2001 SI 2001/4001
The Countryside Access (Local Access Forums) (Wales) Regulations 2001 SI 2001/4002
The Environmental Protection (Restriction on Use of Lead Shot) (Wales) Regulations 2001 SI 2001/4003
The Radioactive Substances (Clocks and Watches) (England and Wales) Regulations 2001 SI 2001/4005
The Housing Renewal Grants (Prescribed Forms and Particulars) (Amendment2) (Wales) Regulations 2001 SI 2001/4006
The Housing Renewal Grants (Amendment2) (Wales) Regulations 2001 SI 2001/4007
The Relocation Grants (Forms of Application) (Amendment 2) (Wales) Regulations 2001 SI 2001/4008
The Foot-and-Mouth Disease (Amendment) (Wales) (No. 13) Order 2001 SI 2001/4009
The Maternity and Parental Leave (Amendment) Regulations 2001 SI 2001/4010
The Electricity and Gas (Energy Efficiency Obligations) Order 2001 SI 2001/4011
The Crown Court (Amendment) ( 3) Rules 2001 SI 2001/4012
The Magistrates' Courts (Detention and Forfeiture of Terrorist Cash) (No. 2) Rules 2001 SI 2001/4013
The Immigration and Asylum Appeals (Procedure) (Amendment) Rules 2001 SI 2001/4014
The Civil Procedure (Amendment 5) Rules 2001 SI 2001/4015
The Civil Procedure (Amendment 6) Rules 2001 SI 2001/4016
The Charities (The Bridge House Estates) Order 2001 SI 2001/4017
The Anti-terrorism, Crime and Security Act 2001 (Commencement 1 and Consequential Provisions) Order 2001 SI 2001/4019
Education (Information About Individual Pupils) (England) Regulations 2001 SI 2001/4020
The Lottery Duty (Amendment) Regulations 2001 SI 2001/4021
The Social Security (Loss of Benefit) Regulations 2001 SI 2001/4022
The Social Security Contributions (Decisions and Appeals) (Amendment) Regulations 2001 SI 2001/4023
The Referrals to the Special Commissioners Regulations 2001 SI 2001/4024
The Civil Courts (Amendment) Order 2001 SI 2001/4025
The Distress for Rent (Amendment) Rules 2001 SI 2001/4026
The Aggregates Levy (Registration and Miscellaneous Provisions) Regulations 2001 SI 2001/4027
The Amusement Machine Licence Duty (Medium-prize Machines) Order 2001 SI 2001/4028
The Foot-and-Mouth Disease (Amendment) (England) (No. 14) Order 2001 SI 2001/4029
The Road Traffic (NHS Charges) Amendment Regulations 2001 SI 2001/4030
The National Health Service Trusts (Membership and Procedure) Amendment (No. 3) (England) Regulations 2001 SI 2001/4031
The Human Rights Act 1998 (Amendment 2)Order 2001 SI 2001/4032
The Finance Act 2001, section 24 and Schedule 4, (Appointed Day) Order 2001 SI 2001/4033
The Amusements with Prizes (Variation of Monetary Limits) Order 2001 SI 2001/4034
The Gaming Act (Variation of Monetary Limits) (No. 2) Order 2001 SI 2001/4035
The Disabled Facilities Grants and Home Repair Assistance (Maximum Amounts) (Amendment 2) (England) Order 2001 SI 2001/4036
The Coventry Technical College (Dissolution) Order 2001 SI 2001/4037
The River Thames (Hungerford Footbridges) (Variation) Order 2001 SI 2001/4038
The Insurers (Winding Up) (Scotland) Rules 2001 SI 2001/4040
The Transport Tribunal (Amendment) Rules 2001 SI 2001/4041
The National Health Service (Travelling Expenses and Remission of Charges) Amendment (No. 3) Regulations 2001 SI 2001/4043
The National Treatment Agency (Amendment) Regulations 2001 SI 2001/4044
The Health Authorities (Membership and Procedure) Amendment (England) (No. 3) Regulations 2001 SI 2001/4045
The Import and Export Restrictions (Foot-And-Mouth Disease) (No. 14) Regulations 2001 SI 2001/4046
The Import and Export Restrictions (Foot-and-Mouth Disease) (Wales) (No. 14) Regulations 2001 SI 2001/4047
The BSE Monitoring (Wales) (Amendment) Regulations 2001 SI 2001/4048
The Welfare Reform and Pensions Act 1999 (Commencement 12) Order 2001 SI 2001/4049
The Transport Act 2000 (Consequential Amendments) Order 2001 SI 2001/4050
The Driving Licences (Disqualification until Test Passed) (Prescribed Offence) Order 2001 SI 2001/4051
The District of Lewes (Electoral Changes) Order 2001 SI 2001/4052
The District of Wealden (Electoral Changes) Order 2001 SI 2001/4053
The District of Rother (Electoral Changes) Order 2001 SI 2001/4054
The City of Brighton and Hove (Electoral Changes) Order 2001 SI 2001/4055
The Borough of Hastings (Electoral Changes) Order 2001 SI 2001/4056
The Borough of Eastbourne (Electoral Changes) Order 2001 SI 2001/4057
The Public Records Act 1958 (Admissibility of Electronic Copies of Public Records) Order 2001 SI 2001/4058
The Vehicles (Crime) Act 2001 (Commencement 2) Order 2001 SI 2001/4059
The Street Works (Charges for Occupation of the Highway) (England) Regulations 2001 SI 2001/4060
The Local Authorities (Contracting Out of Highway Functions) (England) Order 2001 SI 2001/4061
The Borough of Milton Keynes (Electoral Changes) Order 2001 SI 2001/4062
The City of Oxford (Electoral Changes) Order 2001 SI 2001/4063
The District of Vale of White Horse (Electoral Changes) Order 2001 SI 2001/4064
The District of Cherwell (Electoral Changes) Order 2001 SI 2001/4065
The Borough of Bedford (Electoral Changes) Order 2001 SI 2001/4066
The District of Mid Bedfordshire (Electoral Changes) Order 2001 SI 2001/4067
The District of South Bedfordshire (Electoral Changes) Order 2001 SI 2001/4068
The Burnley (Parish) Order 2001 (SI 2001/4069)
The Warwick (Parish) Order 2001 (SI 2001/4070)

4101-4200
The Anti-terrorism, Crime and Security Act 2001 (Commencement 2) (Scotland) Order 2001 SI 2001/4104
The Medicines (Products Other Than Veterinary Drugs) (General Sale List) Amendment (No. 2) Order 2001 SI 2001/4111
The Amalgamation of the Holmewood and Stilton and Yaxley Internal Drainage Districts Order 2001 SI 2001/4114
The Amalgamation of the Whittlesey and Whittlesey Fifth Internal Drainage Districts Order 2001 SI 2001/4115
The Lowestoft Primary Care Trust Change of Name and (Establishment) (Amendment) Order 2001 SI 2001/4116
The Southern Norfolk Primary Care Trust (Establishment) (Amendment) Order 2001 SI 2001/4117
The Lancashire Care National Health Service Trust (Establishment) and the Guild Community Healthcare National Health Service Trust and the North Sefton and the West Lancashire Community National Health Service Trust (Dissolution) Order 2001 SI 2001/4118
The Gloucestershire Hospitals and the Gloucestershire Partnership National Health Service Trusts (Establishment) and the East Gloucestershire National Health Service Trust, the Gloucestershire Royal National Health Service Trust and the Severn National Health Service Trust (Dissolution) Order 2001 SI 2001/4119
The 5 Boroughs Partnership National Health Service Trust (Establishment) and the Warrington Community Health Care National Health Service Trust (Dissolution) Order 2001 SI 2001/4120
The A47 Trunk Road (Hardwick Roundabout) Order 2001 SI 2001/4121
The Castle Point and Rochford Primary Care Trust (Establishment) Order 2001 SI 2001/4122
The Ipswich Primary Care Trust (Establishment) Order 2001 SI 2001/4125
The Central Suffolk Primary Care Trust (Establishment) Order 2001 SI 2001/4126
The Suffolk West Primary Care Trust (Establishment) Order 2001 SI 2001/4127
The Cambridge City Primary Care Trust (Establishment) Order 2001 SI 2001/4128
The Broadland Primary Care Trust (Establishment) Order 2001 SI 2001/4129
The Chelmsford Primary Care Trust (Establishment) Order 2001 SI 2001/4130
The North Norfolk Primary Care Trust (Establishment) Order 2001 SI 2001/4131
The Hinckley and Bosworth Primary Care Trust (Establishment) Order 2001 SI 2001/4132
The Barnsley Primary Care Trust (Establishment) Order 2001 SI 2001/4133
The South Leicestershire Primary Care Trust (Establishment) Order 2001 SI 2001/4134
The East Lincolnshire Primary Care Trust (Establishment) Order 2001 SI 2001/4135
The Charnwood and North West Leicestershire Primary Care Trust (Establishment) Order 2001 SI 2001/4136
The Derbyshire Dales and South Derbyshire Primary Care Trust (Establishment) Order 2001 SI 2001/4137
The Rotherham Primary Care Trust (Establishment) Order 2001 SI 2001/4138
The Bristol South and West Primary Care Trust (Establishment) Order 2001 SI 2001/4139
The Taunton Deane Primary Care Trust (Establishment) Order 2001 SI 2001/4140
The West Gloucestershire Primary Care Trust (Establishment) Order 2001 SI 2001/4141
The Central Cornwall Primary Care Trust (Establishment) Order 2001 SI 2001/4142
The North and East Cornwall Primary Care Trust (Establishment) Order 2001 SI 2001/4143
The Cheltenham and Tewkesbury Primary Care Trust (Establishment) Order 2001 SI 2001/4144
The Cotswold and Vale Primary Care Trust (Establishment) Order 2001 SI 2001/4145
The Bristol North Primary Care Trust (Establishment) Order 2001 SI 2001/4146
The South Somerset Primary Care Trust (Establishment) Order 2001 SI 2001/4147
The Suffolk Coastal Primary Care Trust (Establishment) Order 2001 SI 2001/4148
The Health and Social Care Act 2001 (Commencement 7) (England) Order 2001 SI 2001/4149
The Care Standards Act 2000 (Commencement 10 (England) and Transitional, Savings and Amendment Provisions) Order 2001 SI 2001/4150

References

External links
 Legislation.gov.uk delivered by the UK National Archive
 UK SI's on legislation.gov.uk
 UK Draft SI's on legislation.gov.uk

See also
List of Statutory Instruments of the United Kingdom

Lists of Statutory Instruments of the United Kingdom
Statutory Instruments